The Ditmar Award is Australia's oldest and best-known science fiction, fantasy and horror award, presented annually since 1969, usually at the Australian "Natcon". The historical nominations and results (listed in boldface) of the Award follow.

1969: Eighth Australian Science Fiction Convention, Melbourne

Best Australian Science Fiction of any length, or collection
 Pacific Book Of Australian SF, John Baxter
 False Fatherland, A. Bertram Chandler "Final Flower", Stephen Cook

Best International Science Fiction of any length, or collection
 An Age, Brian Aldiss
 Camp Concentration, Thomas M. Disch The Ring of Ritornel, Charles Harness

Best Contemporary Writer of Science Fiction
 Brian Aldiss R.A. Lafferty
 Samuel R. Delany
 Roger Zelazny

Best Australian Amateur Science Fiction Publication or Fanzine
 Australian Science Fiction Review, John Bangsund The Mentor, Ronald L Clarke
 Rataplan, Leigh Edmonds

1970: Ninth Australian Science Fiction Convention, Melbourne

Best Australian Science Fiction
 "Dancing Gerontius", Lee Harding "Anchor Man", Jack Wodhams
 "Split Personality", Jack Wodhams
 "The Kinsolving's Planet Irregulars", A. Bertram Chandler

Best International Publication
 Amazing Stories
 Vision of Tomorrow

Best International Fiction
 The Left Hand of Darkness, Ursula K. Le Guin
 Cosmicomics, Italo CalvinoBest Australian Fanzine
 S.F. Commentary, Bruce Gillespie
 The Journal of Omphalistic Epistemology, John Foyster1971: Tenth Australian Science Fiction Convention, Melbourne

Best Australian SF
 After Ragnarok, Robert Bowden
 "The Bitter Pill", A. Bertram Chandler Squat, David Rome

Best International Fiction
 Time and the Hunter, Italo Calvino
 "The Region Between", Harlan Ellison
 Tower Of Glass, Robert Silverberg
 No AwardBest Australian Fanzine
 S.F. Commentary, Bruce Gillespie
 The Somerset Gazette, Noel Kerr The New Forerunner, Gary Mason

Special Awards
 SF in the Cinema, John Baxter Vision of Tomorrow, Ron Graham1972: Syncon 2, Sydney

Best Australian Fiction
 "What You Know", A. Bertram Chandler
 "Fallen Spaceman", Lee Harding "The Immortal", Olaf Ruhen
 "The Man Of Slow Feeling", Michael Wilding
 The Authentic Touch, Jack Wodhams

Best International Fiction
 To Your Scattered Bodies Go, Philip Jose Farmer
 "Continued On Next Rock", R.A. Lafferty
 The Lathe of Heaven, Ursula K. Le Guin
 Ringworld, Larry Niven A Time of Changes, Robert Silverberg

Best Australian Fanzine
 Scythrop, John Bangsund
 The Mentor, Ron L. Clarke
 The Fanarchist, David Grigg
 Chao, John Alderson
 S.F. Commentary, Bruce Gillespie1973: Advention 2, Adelaide

Best Australian Fiction
 The Hard Way Up, A. Bertram Chandler
 "Let it Ring", John Ossian (John Foyster) "Gone Fishing", David Rome
 "Budnip", Jack Wodhams

Best International Fiction
 The Gods Themselves, Isaac Asimov The Gorgon Festival, John Boyd
 The IQ Merchant, John Boyd
 Dying Inside, Robert Silverberg

Best Dramatic Presentation
 Aussiefan
 A Clockwork Orange
 Slaughterhouse Five
 Tales From The Crypt

Best Australian Fanzine
 Chao, John Alderson
 Gegenschein, Eric Lindsay
 Rataplan, Leigh Edmonds
 S.F. Commentary, Bruce Gillespie1974: Ozcon, Melbourne
(The programme book for the 1990 Natcon, Danse Macabre, records that no Ditmar Awards were presented in 1974.)

No Ditmar Awards

1975: Syncon '75, Sydney

Best Australian SF
 The Bitter Pill, A. Bertram Chandler The Soft Kill, Colin Free
 "The Ark of James Carlyle", Cherry Wilder

Best International Fiction
 Protector, Larry Niven The Dispossessed, Ursula K. Le Guin
 Frankenstein Unbound, Brian Aldiss

Best Australian Fanzine
 Osiris, Del & Dennis Stocks Forerunner, Sue Clarke
 Fanew Sletter, Leigh Edmonds
 Chao, John Alderson
 Gegenschein, Eric Lindsay

1976: Bofcon, Melbourne

Best Australian Fiction
 The Big Black Mark, A. Bertram Chandler "Way Out West", Cherry Wilder
 The Frozen Sky, Lee Harding (ruled ineligible, because published in 1976)

Best International Fiction
 The Indian Giver, Alfred Bester
 The Shockwave Rider, John Brunner
 The Forever War, Joe Haldeman Inferno, Larry Niven & Jerry Pournelle
 "Down to a Sunless Sea", Cordwainer Smith

Best Australian Fanzine
 Chao, John Alderson
 Fanew Sletter, Leigh Edmonds Mad Dan's Review, Marc Ortlieb
 Osiris, Del & Dennis Stocks
 Interstellar Ramjet Scoop, Bill Wright

William Atheling Jr Award
 Algis Budrys, "Foundation & Asimov"
 James Gunn, Alternative Worlds
 David Ketterer, New Worlds For Old
 George Turner, "Paradigm and Pattern; Form and Meaning in "The Dispossessed"" George Turner, "Philip Dick by 1975"

1977: A-Con 7, Adelaide

Best Australian Science Fiction
 "The Ins and Outs of the Hadhya City State", Phillipa Maddern
 Kelly Country, A. Bertram Chandler
 Future Sanctuary, Lee Harding
 Walkers on the Sky, David LakeBest International Fiction
 A World Out of Time, Larry Niven The Space Machine, Christopher Priest The Hand of Oberon, Roger Zelazny
 "Piper at the Gates of Dawn", Richard Cowper

Best Australian Fanzine
 S.F. Commentary, Bruce Gillespie Mad Dan's Review, Marc Ortlieb
 Enigma, Van Ikin
 South of Harad, East of Rhun, Jon Noble

William Atheling Award
 George Turner, "Theme as an Element of Fiction"
 George Turner, "The Jonah Kit" George Turner & Peter Nicholls, "Plumbers of the Cosmos"

Special committee award
 "The Ins and Outs of the Hadhya City State", Phillipa Maddern1978: Unicon IV, Melbourne

Australian Science Fiction, Best Novel
 The Right Hand of Dextra, David Lake
 The Wildings of Westron, David Lake
 The Weeping Sky, Lee Harding
 The Luck of Brin's Five, Cherry WilderAustralian Science Fiction, Best Short Fiction
 "Albert's Bellyful", Francis Payne (Yggdrasil, Feb '77) "Ignorant of Magic", Phillipa C. Maddern (View From The Edge)
 "The Two Body Problem", Bruce Barnes (View From The Edge)
 "The Long Fall", A. Bertram Chandler (Amazing, July '77)

Best International Fiction
 In the Hall Of the Martian Kings, John Varley, F&SF, Feb '77
 The Silmarillion, J. R. R. Tolkien (Allen & Unwin) Our Lady Of Darkness, (aka The Pale Brown Thing) Fritz Leiber, (Berkeley Putnam/F&SF, Jan February 77)
 A Dream of Wessex, Chris Priest (Faber)
 "The House of Compassionate Sharers", Michael Bishop (Cosmos No 1)
 The Silver in the Tree, Susan Cooper (Chatto & Windus)
 Gateway, Frederik Pohl (Gollancz or Ballantine)

Best Amateur Australian Publication (Fanzine)
 Yggdrasil, Dennis Callegari & Alan Wilson
 Enigma, Van Ikin Minardor, Marc Ortlieb
 Fanew Sletter, Leigh Edmonds
 Epsilon Eridani Express, Neville J. Angove

William Atheling Jr Award
 George Turner, "The Martial Art of SF Criticism", Yggdrasil, Feb, May & August 1977
 Andrew Whitmore, "The Novels of D.G. Compton", SF Commentary, No 52. Robert Scholes & Eric S. Rabkin, Science Fiction: History Science Vision, O.U.P
 George Turner, "The Silverberg Phenomenon", SF Commentary, No 51
 Van Ikin, Review of 'Going'

1979: Syncon '79, Sydney

Best Australian Fiction
 To Keep The Ship, A. Bertram Chandler (DAW)
 Beloved Son, George Turner (Faber) Play Little Victims, Kenneth Cook (Pergamon Press)
 "Pie Row Joe", Kevin McKay, Rooms of Paradise (Quartet)

Best International Fiction
 The Far Call, Gordon R. Dickson (Quantum)
 Dreamsnake, Vonda McIntyre (Houghton & Mifflin)
 Stardance II, Spider and Jeanne Robinson, Analog, Sept to November 1978
 "The Persistence of Vision", John Varley, F&SF, March 1978
 The White Dragon, Anne McCaffreyBest Australian Fanzine
 Forerunner, Jack R. Herman
 Yggdrasil, Dennis Callegari & Alan Wilson
 Scytale, Peter Toluzzi
 The Epsilon Eridani Express, Neville J. Angove
 Chunder!, John FoysterBest Australian Fanwriter
 Leanne Frahm
 John Bangsund
 Marc Ortlieb Anthony Peacy
 Eric Lindsay
 John Foyster

William Atheling Jr Award
 Susan Wood, "Women and Science Fiction", Algol 33, 1978 John Bangsund, Parergon Papers 10, ANZAPA, October 1978
 John McPharlin, "On The Ebb Tide of the New Wave", Auto Delerium, March 1978
 Lloyd Biggle Jr, "The Morasses of Academe Revisited", Analog, September 1978

1980: Swancon 5, Perth

Australian Fiction
 Moon in the Ground, Keith Antill
 Displaced Person, Lee Harding
 Australian Gnomes, Robert Ingpen "One Clay Foot", Jack Wodhams

Best International Fiction
 The Hitch-Hiker's Guide to the Galaxy, Douglas Adams Castle Roogna, Piers Anthony
 The Flight of Dragons, Peter Dickinson
 Dragondrums, Anne McCaffrey
 Titan, John Varley

Best Australian Fanzine
 Bionic Rabbit, Damian Brennan
 The Wasffan, Roy Ferguson
 Chunder, John Foyster
 S.F. Commentary, Bruce Gillespie Forerunner, Jack Herman

Best Australian Fan Writer
 Damian Brennan
 Roy Ferguson
 Leanne Frahm Jack R. Herman
 Marc Ortlieb

Best Australian SF or Fantasy Artist
 Bevan Casey
 Chris Johnston
 Rob McGough
 John Packer
 Marilyn Pride Jane Taubman

William Atheling Award for Criticism in SF or Fantasy
 Terry Dowling, "The Art of Xenography", Science Fiction 3
 Bruce Gillespie, "The Man Who Filled the Void" & "By Our Fruits", S.F. Commentary 55/56
 Jack R. Herman, "Paradox as a Paradigm: A Review of Thomas Covenant the Unbeliever by Stephen Donaldson", Forerunner, May 1979 George Turner, "Delany: A Victim of the Great Applause", Yggdrasil 3/79

1981: Advention '81, Adelaide

Best Australian Novel
 The Dreaming Dragons, Damien Broderick Breathing Space Only, Wynne Whiteford
 Looking for Blucher, Jack Wodhams
 The Fourth Hemisphere, David Lake

Best Australian Short Fiction
 "Deus Ex Corporus", Leanne Frahm "The Pastseer", Phillipa Maddern
 "Passage to Earth", Leanne Frahm
 "Horg", Jay Hoffman

Best International Fiction
 Mockingbird, Walter Tevis
 The Snow Queen, Joan D. Vinge
 Timescape, Gregory Benford The Wounded Land, Stephen R. Donaldson

Best Australian Fanzine
 Australian Science Fiction News, Mervyn R. Binns
 Q36, Marc Ortlieb Chunder, John Foyster
 S.F. Commentary, Bruce Gillespie

Best Australian Fanwriter
 Leigh Edmonds
 Leanne Frahm
 David Grigg
 Marc OrtliebBest Australian SF or Fantasy Artist
 John Packer
 Marilyn Pride Jane Taubman
 Julie Vaux

William Atheling Jr Award
 Algis Budrys, "Charting Paradise"
 Christopher Priest, "Outside the Whale"
 John Sladek, "Four Reasons for Reading Thomas M. Disch"
 George Turner, "Frederik Pohl as a Creator of Future Societies", and "Samuel Delany: Victim of Great Applause"1982: Tschaicon, Melbourne
(The Australian newszine Thyme records that Tschaicon was the "First Australasian Science Fiction Convention", the relevant constitution having had "Australian" replaced with "Australasian" throughout; that the award categories used "Australasian" rather than "Australian"; and that the constitution was modified, at Tschaicon, to have "Australasian" changed back to "Australian".)

There was an award from the committee, in the form of a miniature Ditmar Award, to Marc Ortlieb for Best Toastmastering. 

Best Long Australasian Science Fiction or Fantasy
 The Anarch Lords, A. Bertram Chandler
 Bard, Keith Taylor
 Behind the Wind, Patricia Wrightson
 City of Women, David Ireland
 The Man Who Loved Morlocks, David LakeBest Short Australasian Science Fiction or Fantasy
 Armstrong, Jack Wodhams
 Tales of Mirric, Elizabeth Travers
 Where Silence Rules, Keith TaylorBest International Fiction
 The Affirmation, Chris Priest The Claw of the Conciliator, Gene Wolfe
 Radix, A.A. Attanasio
 The Sirian Experiments, Doris Lessing

Best Australasian Fanzine
 Australian SF News, ed. Merv Binns
 Q36, ed. Marc Ortlieb S.F. Commentary, ed. Bruce Gillespie
 Thyme, ed. Andrew Brown and Irwin Hirsh
 Weberwoman's Wrevenge, ed. Jean Weber

Best Australasian Fan Writer
 Leigh Edmonds
 Judith Hanna
 Eric Lindsay
 Marc OrtliebBest Australasian SF or Fantasy Artist
 Steph Campbell
 Chris Johnston
 John Packer
 Marilyn PrideWilliam Atheling Award
 Damien Broderick, "The Lately Great Alfred Bester", S.F. Commentary 6266
 Thomas Disch, "The Labor Day Group" F&SF, February 1981
 Bruce Gillespie, "Sing a Song of Daniel", S.F. Commentary 62661983: Syncon '83, Sydney

Best Australian Science Fiction or Fantasy
 "The Man Who Walks Away Behind the Eyes", Terry Dowling, Omega, May 1982 The Lances of Nengesdul, Keith Taylor
 Vaneglory, George Turner

Best International Science Fiction or Fantasy
 No Enemy But Time, Michael Bishop
 The One Tree, Stephen R. Donaldson
 Ridley Walker, Russell Hoban Roderick, John Sladek

Best Australian Fanzine
 Ornithopter, Leigh Edmonds
 Q36, Marc Ortlieb Science Fiction, Van Ikin
 Thyme, eds. Andrew Brown & Irwin Hirsh; ed. Roger Weddall
 Weberwoman's Wrevenge, Jean Weber

Best Australian Fanwriter
 Terry Dowling
 Leigh Edmonds
 Marc OrtliebBest Australian SF or Fantasy Artist
 Kerrie Hanlon
 Chris Johnston
 Marilyn Pride Nick Stathopoulos

Best Australian SF or Fantasy Cartoonist
 Terry Frost
 Michael McGann
 John Packer Jane Taubman
 Julie Vaux

Best Australian SF or Fantasy Editor
 Neville Angove
 Mervyn Binns
 Ron L. Clarke
 Paul Collins
 Van Ikin Norstrilia Press

William Atheling Award (for critical writings)
 Terry Dowling, "Kirth Gersen: The Other Demon Prince", Science Fiction 11 Terry Dowling, "The Lever of Life: Winning and Losing in the Fiction of Cordwainer Smith", Science Fiction 10
 Bruce Gillespie, S.F. Commentary: The First Year, Bruce Gillespie

Special Award
 Robin Johnson, Contribution to Fandom1984: Eureka!con, Melbourne
There were insufficient nominations for the William Atheling Jr Award.

Best Australian Long Science Fiction or Fantasy
 The Tempting of the Witch King, Russell Blackford (Cory & Collins)
 The Judas Mandala, Damien Broderick (Timescape)
 Valencies, Damien Broderick & Rory Barnes (University of Queensland Press)
 Kelly Country, Bertram Chandler (Penguin)
 Yesterday's Men, George Turner, (Faber) Thor's Hammer, Wynne Whiteford (Cory & Collins)

Best Australian Short Science Fiction or Fantasy
 "Crystal Soldier", Russell Blackford (Dreamworks, ed. David King, Norstrilia Press)
 "Life the Solitude", Kevin McKay (Dreamworks, ed. David King, Norstrilia Press)
 "Land Deal", Gerald Murnane (Dreamworks, ed. David King, Norstrilia Press)
 "Above Atlas His Shoulders", Andrew Whitmore (Dreamworks, ed. David King, Norstrilia Press)

Best International Fiction
 The Birth of the People's Republic of Antarctica, John Calvin Batchelor (Dial Press)
 The Tempting of the Witch King, Russell Blackford (Cory and Collins)
 Dr Who (BBC)
 Pilgerman, Russell Hoban (Jonathan Cape)
 Yesterday's Men, George Turner (Faber)
 Thor's Hammer, Wynne Whiteford (Cory & Collins)
 No AwardBest Australian Fanzine
 Australian Science Fiction News, Merv Binns
 Rataplan/Ornithopter, Leigh Edmonds Science Fiction, Van Ikin
 Thyme, Roger Weddall
 Wahf-full, Jack Herman

Best Australian Fanwriter
 Leigh Edmonds Terry Frost
 Jack Herman
 Seth Lockwood

Best Australian SF or Fantasy Artist
 Neville Bain
 Steph Campbell
 Mike Dutkiewicz
 Chris Johnston
 Nick StathopoulosBest Australian SF or Fantasy Cartoonist
 Bill Flowers
 Terry Frost
 Craig Hilton
 Mike McGann
 John Packer Clint Strickland

Best Australian SF or Fantasy Editor
 Paul Collins
 Van Ikin David King
 Norstrilia Press - Bruce Gillespie, Carey Handfield and Rob Gerrand

1985: Advention '85, Adelaide
The awards ceremony included presentation of the A. Bertram Chandler Award to Lee Harding, and another three special awards to Damien Broderick, for Transmitters; John Foyster, for past work in fandom; and the Nova Mob, for going on for a long time.(The A. Bertram Chandler Award is a separate award.)

Best Australian Novel
 The Beast of Heaven, Victor Kelleher The Last Amazon, A. Bertram Chandler
 The Wild Ones, A. Bertram Chandler
 Suburbs of Hell, Randolph Stow

Best Australian Short Fiction
 "Terrarium", Terry Dowling, Omega, May/June 1984 "The Maze Man", Terry Dowling, Men's Journal, Summer 1984
 "Resurrection", Damien Broderick, IASFM, August 1984
 "Three Star Trek", Ron Ferguson, Omega, Sept/October 1984

Best International Fiction
 Neuromancer, William Gibson (Ace) The Final Encyclopedia, Gordon R. Dickson (Tor)
 Native Tongues, Suzette Haden Elgin, (DAW)
 Damiano's Lute, R.A. MacAvoy (Bantam)

Best Australian Fanzine
 Australian SF News, Merv Binns The Mentor, Ron L. Clarke
 Rataplan, Leigh Edmonds
 Science Fiction, Van Ikin

Best Australian Fanwriter
 Leigh Edmonds David Grigg
 Leanne Frahm
 Yvonne Rousseau

Best Australian SF or Fantasy Artist, Cartoonist or Illustrator
 Nick Stathopoulos Craig Hilton
 Kerrie Hanlon
 Peter Reading

Best Australian SF or Fantasy Editor
 Paul Collins
 Van Ikin
 Philip Gore
 Bruce GillespieBest Australian SF or Fantasy Dramatic Presentation
 Boiling Frog, Stage play with productions in Adelaide & Sydney
 Beach Blanket Tempest, Rock Fantasy stage musical (Half Moon Production)
 Iceman, Fred Schepisi Director
 Iceman, Bruce Smeaton Musical score
 Thief of Sydney, Animated feature 15 minutes
 Kindred Spirits, ABC TelemovieWilliam Atheling Jr Award
 George Turner, In The Heart or in the Head
 John Foyster, Article on George Turner, ASFN 1984
 Damien Broderick, SF Reviews, The Age, 1984
 John Baxter, SF Reviews, The Australian, 1984

1986: Swancon XI, Perth

Best Australian Science Fiction Novel
 Landscape With Landscapes, Gerald Murnane (Norstrilia)
 Illywacker, Peter Carey (UQP) The Changelings of Chaan, David Lake (Hyland House)
 The Transing Syndrome, Kurt von Trojan (Rigby)

Best Australian Short Fiction
 "The Twist of Fate", David Grigg, Urban Fantasies
 "Glass Reptile Breakout", Russell Blackford, Strange Attractors/Omega
 "Montage", Lucy Sussex, Urban Fantasies
 "The Fittest", George Turner, Urban Fantasies
 "The Lipton Village Society", Lucy Sussex, Strange Attractors
 "The Bullet That Grows in the Gun", Terry Dowling, Urban Fantasies

Best International Fiction
 Devil in a Forest, Gene Wolfe (Granada)
 Tik Tok, John Sladek (Corgi)
 Free Live Free, Gene Wolfe (Gollancz)
 Peace, Gene Wolfe (Chatto)
 The Compass Rose, Ursula K. Le Guin (Bantam, also Underwood & Miller, and Harper and Row) Elleander Morning, Jerry Yulsman (Orbit/Futura)

Best Australian Fanzine
 The Notional, Leigh Edmonds
 The Metaphysical Review, Bruce Gillespie Thyme, Roger Weddall & Peter Burns
 Tigger, Marc Ortlieb
 Sikander, Irwin Hirsh

Best Australian Fanwriter
 Bruce Gillespie
 Damien Broderick
 Leigh Edmonds Yvonne Rousseau
 Marc Ortlieb

Best Australian SF or Fantasy Artist
 Lewis Morley
 John Packer
 Betty de Gabrielle
 Nick Stathopoulos Marilyn Pride
 Craig Hilton

William Atheling Jr Award
 Norman Talbot
 Russell Blackford
 George Turner, "Neuromancer et al." Yvonne Rousseau

1987: Capcon, Canberra

Best Australian Science Fiction or Fantasy Novel
 Bard III: The Wild Sea, Keith Taylor (Ace) "Oasis", Patrick Urth, Aphelion 1-4
 Taronga, Victor Kelleher (Viking Kestrel)
 The Black Grail, Damien Broderick (Avon)
 Adventures Of Christian Rosy Cross, David Foster (Penguin)

Best Australian Science Fiction or Fantasy Short Fiction
 "Shut the Door When You Go Out", George Turner, Aphelion 4
 "The Man Who Lost Red", Terry Dowling "Time of the Star", Terry Dowling, Aphelion 3
 "A Dragon Between His Fingers", Terry Dowling, Omega, May/June
 "For the Man Who Has Everything", Chris Simmons, Aphelion 1

Best Australian Fanzine
 The Space Wastrel, Mark Loney, Michelle Muijsert, Julian Warner
 Motional, Anonymous
 Larrikin, Irwin Hirsh & Perry Middlemiss
 Metaphysical Review, Bruce Gillespie
 Thyme, Roger Weddall and Peter BurnsBest Australian SF or Fantasy Artist
 Craig Hilton Nick Stathopoulos
 Kerrie Hanlon
 Betty deGabriele
 John Packer

Outstanding Contribution to Australian Fandom
 Carey Handfield, T.R.O. (The Real Official.) Jessica Aldridge
 Peter McNamara
 Michelle Muijsert
 John Foyster

William Atheling Jr Award for Criticism or Review
 Russell Blackford, "Debased and Lascivious" Dave Luckett
 Margaret Winch, "Frank's Tank"
 Michael J Tolley

1988: Conviction, Sydney

Best Australian Long Fiction
 For As Long As You Burn, Terry Dowling, Aphelion 5 The Makers, Victor Kelleher (Viking, Kestrel)
 Bard IV: Raven's Gathering, Keith Taylor (Ace)
 The Sea and the Summer, George Turner (Faber)
 The Hyades Contact, Wynne Whiteford (Ace)

Best Australian Short Fiction
 The Dirty Little Unicorn, Stephen Dedman
 "The Last Elephant", Terry Dowling, Australian Short Stories #20 "Marmordesse", Terry Dowling, Omega, January 1987
 "The Supramarket", Leanne Frahm, Doom City
 "The Celestial Intervention Agency", Karen Herkes, Time Loop #70

Best Australian Fanzine
 Australian Science Fiction Review, Melbourne Collective eds
 Larrikin, Irwin Hirsh, Perry Middlemiss
 Science Fiction, Van Ikin The Space Wastrel, Mark Loney, Michelle Muijsert, Julian Warner

Best Australian Fan Writer
 Karen Herkes
 Jack R. Herman
 Irwin Hirsh
 Van Ikin
 Perry MiddlemissBest Fan Artist
 Donna Angus
 Kerrie Hanlon
 Craig Hilton
 David Kenyon
 Stephen McArthur
 Lewis MorleyWilliam Atheling Jr Award for Criticism or Review
 Russell Blackford, "Deconstructing the Demon: John Calvin Bachelor's Novels" ASFR #11
 Richard Erlich & Peter Hall, "A Prefilmic, Post-Poststructurialist Prostruction of Alien/Alien3", ASFR #11
 John Foyster, Review of Trillion Year Spree, ASFR #7
 Van Ikin, "Mirror Reversals and the Tolkien Writing Game", Science Fiction #25 Susan Margaret, "Structural Analysis of SF. Why?", The Space Wastrel
 Janeen Webb, "I Know Who I am, But What is my Brand Name?"

1989: Swancon 14, Perth

Best Australian Long Fiction
 Striped Holes, Damien Broderick (Avon) West of the Moon, David Lake (Hyland)
 Huaco of the Golden God, Carolyn Logan (A&R)
 Beyond The Labyrinth, Gillian Rubinstein, (Hyland)

Best Australian Short Fiction
 "A Tale of Nine Cats", Katherine Cummings, Conviction Programme
 "Scatter My Ashes", Greg Egan, Interzone #23
 "Things fall apart", Philippa Maddern, Matilda at the Speed of Light
 "The Colors of the Masters", Sean McMullen, F&SF March 1988
 "My Lady Tongue", Lucy Sussex, Matilda at the Speed of Light

Best International Fiction
 Dawn, Octavia Butler (Gollancz)
 Seventh Son, Orson Scott Card (Legend) Aegypt, John Crowley (Gollancz)
 Mona Lisa Overdrive, William Gibson (Gollancz)
 On Stranger Tides, Tim Powers (Grafton)
 Life During Wartime, Lucius Shepard (Grafton)
 Islands in the Net, Bruce Sterling (Century)

Best Australian Fanzine
 SFR, SF Collective
 Get Stuffed, Jacob Blake Larrikin, Perry Middlemiss & Irwin Hirsh
 Science Fiction, Van Ikin

Best Australian Fanwriter
 Bruce Gillespie Jack Herman
 Van Ikin
 Perry Middlemiss

Best Fan Artist
 Ian Gunn (Get Stuffed, Australian Playbeing, etc.)
 Kerrie Hanlon (Conviction Programme, T-shirt, etc.)
 Craig Hilton (Larrikin, Thyme, etc.)
 Mike McGann (Get Stuffed, mediazines, etc.)
 Kiera McKenzie (Australian Realms)
 Phil Wlodarczyk (Get Stuffed, Ethel the Aardvark, etc.)

William Atheling Jr Award
 Russell Blackford, ASFR articles Martin Bridgstock, "Sea & Summer" (ASFR), and "Counter Earth/Counter Humanity" (Metaphysical Review)
 Janeen Webb, ASFR articles
 Arthur Webster, "Speaker for the Dead" (Get Stuffed)

1990: Danse Macabre, Melbourne
The William Atheling Jr Award for Criticism or Review was withdrawn due to insufficient nominations.

Best Australian Long Fiction
 Victor Kelleher, The Red King (Viking Kestrel)
 Keith Taylor, The Sorcerer's Sacred Isle (Ace)
 Wynne Whiteford, Lake of the Sun (Ace)Best Australian Short Fiction
 Terry Dowling, "The Quiet Redemption of Andy the House", Australian Short Stories #26 (June 1989) Rosaleen Love, "If You Go Down to the Park Today", Total Devotion Machine (Women's Press)
 Rosaleen Love, "Total Devotion Machine", Total Devotion Machine(Women's Press)
 Petrina Smith, "Over the Edge", Mirrors: Redress Novellas (Women's Redress Press)

Best Australian Fanzine
 SF Collective, ASFR
 Melbourne Science Fiction Club, Ethel The Aardvark (ed. Alan Stewart) Jacob Blake, Get Stuffed
 Jack R. Herman, Sweetness and Light

Best Australian Fanwriter
 Terry Frost
 Bruce Gillespie Ian Gunn Jack Herman
 Yvonne Hintz
 Alan Stewart

Best Fan Artist
 Ian Gunn Kerrie Hanlon
 Craig Hilton
 Phil Wlodarczyk

1991: Suncon, Brisbane

Best Fannish Cat

 Apple Blossom, humans: Elaine Cochrane & Bruce Gillespie
 Constantinople, human: Phil Wlodarczyk	
 Emma Peel, human: Terry Frost	
 Godzilla, humans: Ian Gunn & Karen Pender-Gunn	
 Honey, humans: Gerald [Smith] & Womble
 Satan, human: Phil Wlodarczyk
 Truffle, humans: Mark Loney & Michelle Muijsert
 Typo, human: Roger Weddall

Best Fanzine
 Australian Science Fiction Review, (Second series), edited by the Science Fiction Collective Doxa!, Roman Orszanski
 Doxy, John Foyster
 Ethel the Aardvark, Alan Stewart
 Pink, Karen Pender-Gunn
 StunGunn, Ian Gunn

Best Australian Novel or Anthology
 A Pursuit of Miracles, George Turner(Aphelion Press)
 Fortress of Eternity, Andrew Whitmore (Avon Books)
 My Lady Tongue and Other Tales, Lucy Sussex (William Heinemann)
 Rynosseros, Terry Dowling (Aphelion Press) The Specialist, Wynne Whiteford (Ace)

Best Australian Short Fiction
 "Generation Gap", George Turner, A Pursuit of Miracles (Aphelion)
 "God and Her Black Sense of Humour", Lucy Sussex, My Lady Tongue and Other Tales (William Heinemann)
 "Red Ochre", Lucy Sussex, My Lady Tongue and Other Tales (William Heinemann)
 "The Caress", Greg Egan, Isaac Asimov's SF Magazine January 1990
 "Turtle Soup", Rosaleen Love, Eidolon 3, December 1990
 "While the Gate is Open", Sean McMullen, F&SF February 1990Best Australian Fan Artist
 Ian Gunn Craig Hilton
 Marion Plumridge
 Phil Wlodarczyk

Best Australian Fan Writer
 Terry Frost
 Bruce Gillespie Ian Gunn
 Marc Ortlieb
 Alan Stewart

William Atheling Jr Award
 Russell Blackford, "Analogues of Anomie: Lee Harding's Novels" in Science Fiction 30 & Australian Science Fiction Review (Second Series)
 Bruce Gillespie, "The Non-SF Novels of Philip K. Dick", ANZAPA 136, October 1990 Peter Nicholls, "Fantastic World" reviews in the Melbourne Sunday Herald
 Alan Stewart, Reviews in Ethel the Aardvark and SF Commentary

1992: Syncon, Sydney
The awards ceremony included presentation of five special awards from the Syncon committee to Jack R. Herman, Eric B. Lindsay,  Ron Clarke, Sue Clarke, and Shayne McCormack.

Best Novel or Collection
 From Sea to Shining Star, A. Bertram Chandler 
 Wormwood, Terry Dowling Brother Night, Victor Kelleher
 Del-Del, Victor Kelleher
 Brainchild, George Turner

Best Short Fiction
 "Vanities", Terry Dowling
 "Nobody's Fool", Terry Dowling
 "A Deadly Edge Their Red Beaks Pass Along", Terry Dowling
 "Olive Truffles", Leanne Frahm
 "The Dominant Style", Sean McMullen
 "Alone in his Chariot", Sean McMullen (Eidolon)Best Fanzine
 Eidolon, ed Jonathan Strahan, Richard Scriven and Jeremy Byrne Ethel the Aardvark, Alan Stewart
 Inconsequential Parallax, Tim Richards & Narrelle Harris
 Thyme, LynC & Clive Newall
 Thyme, Greg Hills & Mark Loney

Best Fan Writer
 James Allen
 Terry Frost
 Bruce Gillespie Greg Hills
 Alan Stewart

Best Artist
 Ian Gunn
 Craig Hilton
 Nick Stathopoulos Phil Wlodarczyk

William Atheling Jr Award for Criticism or Review
 "Jonathan Carroll, Storyteller", Bruce Gillespie
 "Going Commercial", Sean McMullen (Eidolon 6) Review of The Fantastic Civil War, Blair Ramage

1993: Swancon 18, Perth

Best Long Fiction
 Blue Tyson, Terry Dowling
 Quarantine, Greg Egan Back Door Man, Ian M. Hails
 Call to the Edge, Sean McMullen
 Brainchild, George Turner
 And Disregards the Rest, Paul Voermans

Best Short Fiction
 "Privateer's Moon", Terry Dowling (Blue Tyson)
 "Ship's Eye", Terry Dowling (Eidolon 8)
 "Closer", Greg Egan (Eidolon 9) "Worthless", Greg Egan (In Dreams)
 "The Seas of Castle Hill Road", Rick Kennett (Eidolon 9)
 "It's All in the Way You Look at It", Michael Pryor (Aurealis 10)

Best Periodical
 Slow Glass Books Catalog, Justin Ackroyd
 Eidolon, Jeremy G. Byrne, Richard Scriven, Jonathan Strahan Ethel the Aardvark, Alan Stewart
 Thyme, Alan Stewart
 Aurealis, Dirk Strasser & Stephen Higgins

Best Fan Writer
 Paul Ewings
 Terry Frost
 Robin Pen Karen Pender-Gunn
 Alan Stewart
 Roger Weddall

Best Artwork
 "Fanimals", Ian Gunn
 "Space Time Buccaneers", Ian Gunn (Inconsequential Parallax)
 1992 Ditmar Award, Lewis Morley
 Cover art for Blue Tyson, Nick Stathopoulos "Relics", Shaun Tan (Eidolon 9)
 "Snowman", Leisl Yvette (Eidolon 9)

William Atheling Jr Award
 "Five Go Camping with 12.1 Club", Paul Ewins (Ethel the Aardvark 41)
 "James Morrow and the ERNI", Bruce Gillespie (Nova Mob, ANZAPA 148)
 "Australian SF Art Turns 50", Sean McMullen (Eidolon 7) "From Fantasy to Gallileo", Sean McMullen(Nova Mob, Eidolon 10)
 Reviews in Ethel the Aardvark, Karen Pender-Gunn

1994: Constantinople, Melbourne

Best Long Fiction or Collection
 The Destiny Makers, George Turner Graffiti, Dirk Strasser
 Twilight Beach, Terry Dowling
 The Weird Colonial Boy, Paul Voermans

Best Short Fiction
 "Catalyst", Leanne Frahm, Terror Australis
 "Starbaby", Rosaleen Love, Overland, December 93
 "The Lottery", Lucy Sussex, Overland, December 93
 "Ghosts of the Fall", Sean Williams, Writers of the Future IX

Best Professional Art Work
 Galaxy Bookshop Dragon, Lewis Morley
 Twilight Beach Cover, Nick StathopoulosBest Fan Writer
 Paul Ewins
 Terry Frost
 Bruce Gillespie Jan MacNally

Best Fan Artist
 Ian Gunn
 Craig Hilton
 Pamela Rendall
 Steve Scholz
 Kerri Valkova Phil Wlodarczyk

Best Fanzine
 Black Light
 Ethel the Aardvark, Paul Ewins Get Stuffed
 SF Commentary
 The Mentor
 Thyme

William Atheling Jr Award
 "Five Bikers of the Apocalypse", Leigh Edmonds, Eidolon #12
 "SF Sucks", James Allen, Get Stuffed #6 "Silverberg Not Moving", Damien Broderick, SF Commentary 73/74/75

1995: Thylacon, Hobart

Best Australian Long Fiction
 Deersnake, Lucy Sussex (Hodder)
 Genetic Soldier, George Turner (William Morrow)
 Permutation City, Greg Egan (Millennium) Voices in the Light, Sean McMullen (Aphelion)

Best Australian Short Fiction
 "Cocoon", Greg Egan, Asimov's SF, May 1994 "Jinx Ship", Leanne Frahm, The Patternmaker
 "Land's End", Leanne Frahm, Alien Shores
 "Our Lady of Chernobyl", Greg Egan, Interzone 83, May 1994
 "The Patternmaker", Dave Luckett, The Patternmaker

Best Professional Artwork
 Shaun Tan, for artwork in Aurealis and EidolonBest Fanzine
 Gegenschein, Eric Lindsay
 The Mentor, Ron Clarke
 Sirius, Garry Wyatt
 Thyme, Alan StewartBest Fan Writer
 Terry Frost Ian Gunn
 Graham Stone

Best Fan Artist
 Ian Gunn Kerri Valkova

Special Committee Award
 Peter Nicholls1996: Swancon 21, Perth

Best Long Fiction
 An Intimate Knowledge of the Night, Terry Dowling (Aphelion)
 Mirrorsun Rising, Sean McMullen (Aphelion) 
 Sabriel, Garth Nix (Moonstone/Harper Collins)
 She's Fantastical, Lucy Sussex & Judith Buckrich (Sybylla)
 The Unknown Soldier, Sean Williams & Shane Dix (Aphelion)

Best Short Fiction
 "Entropy", Leanne Frahm, She's Fantastical (Sybylla)
 "Schrödinger's Fridge", Ian Gunn, Aurealis #15 "A Sky Full of Ravens", Sue Isle, She's Fantastical (Sybylla)
 "Angel Thing", Petrina Smith, She's Fantastical (Sybylla)
 "A Map of the Mines of Barnath", Sean Williams, Eidolon #16, February 1995
 "The Perfect Gun", Sean Williams, Eidolon #17/18, June 1995

Best Publication/Fanzine (Periodical)
 Eidolon, J. Byrne, R. Scriven & J. Strahan Ethel the Aardvark, Paul Ewins
 The Metaphysical Review, Bruce Gillespie
 Pinkette, Karen Pender-Gunn
 Thyme, Alan Stewart

Best Artwork
 Thyme 106 (Cover), Ian Gunn
 An Intimate Knowledge of the Night (Cover), Nick Stathopoulos
 Eidolon 19 (Cover), Shaun TanBest Non-Professional/Fan Writer
 Terry Frost
 Ian Gunn Cheryl Morgan
 Alan Stewart

Best Non-Professional/Fan Artist
 Ian Gunn Steve Scholz
 Kerri Valkova

William Atheling Jnr Award
 Reading by Starlight, Damien Broderick (Routledge)
 "The Hunt for Australian Horror Fiction", Bill Congreve, Sean McMullen & Steven Paulsen, The Scream Factory #16, November 19951997: Basicon 2, Melbourne

Best Australian Long Fiction
 Dreamweavers, Paul Collins (ed) (Penguin Books)
 The Memory Cathedral, Jack Dann (Bantam)
 Scarlet Rider, Lucy Sussex (Tor/Forge) Metal Fatigue, Sean Williams (Harper Collins)

Best Australian Short Fiction
 "The Sword of God", Russell Blackford, Dreamweavers
 "The Ichneumon and the Dormeuse", Terry Dowling, Interzone #106
 "Borderline", Leanne Frahm, Borderline (MirrorDanse Books)
 The Stray Cat, Steven Paulsen (Lothian)

Best Fanzine
 The Communicator, Derek Screen
 Emerald City, Cheryl Morgan
 Oscillation Overthruster, Sue Ann Barber
 Pinkette, Karen Pender-Gunn
 Science Fiction, Van Ikin
 Thyme, Alan StewartBest Fan Writer
 Terry Frost
 Bruce Gillespie Ian Gunn
 Cheryl Morgan
 Karen Pender-Gunn

Best Fan Artist
 Ian Gunn Steve Scholz
 Kerri Valkova
 Phil Wlodarczyk

Best Professional Artwork
 Trudi Canavan for art in Aurealis #17, and Eidolon #22/23
 Norm & Margaret Hetherington for Mr Squiggle, ABC TV
 Elizabeth Kyle, Cover of Dreamweavers
 Shaun Tan for artwork in Eidolon and the cover of The Stray Cat
 Jason Towers for "Valdo Over Evora" cover, Australian Realms #28

William Atheling Jr. Award for Criticism or Review
 Russell Blackford, for "The Tiger in the Prison House", Science Fiction #37, Reviews of Distress in Science Fiction and NYRSF, and "Jewels in Junk City" in Review of Contemporary Fiction
 Alan Stewart, for reviews in Thyme
 Janeen Webb, for "Post human SF: Lost in Cyberspace", The Festival of Imagination Program Book

1998: Thylacon II, Hobart

Best Long Fiction
 The White Abacus, Damien Broderick (Avon Books) Winter, Simon Brown (HarperCollins)
 Darkfall, Isobelle Carmody (Penguin)
 Old Bones, Paul Collins
 Sinner, Sara Douglass (HarperCollins)

Best Short Fiction
 "Niagara Falling", Janeen Webb & Jack Dann, Black Mist
 "Lucent Carbon", Russell Blackford, Eidolon 25/26
 "The Willcroft Inheritance", Rick Kennett and Paul Collins, Gothic Ghosts
 "Reasons to be Cheerful", Greg Egan, Interzone #118, [Withdrawn.]
 "Grievous Music", Carole Nomarhas, Eidolon 24

Best Dramatic Presentation
 Spellbinder 2, Nine Network Degree Absolute, Bedlam Theatre Company
 Multiverse Ceremonies Video

Best Artwork/Artist
 Kerri Valkova
 Marc McBride, Shivers Series
 Nick Stathopoulos Robert Jan
 R & D Studios, Eidolon Cover
 Shaun Tan, The Viewer

Best Fanzine
 Eidolon Frontier
 Thyme
 Captain's Log
 Oscillation Overthruster

Best Fan Writer
 George Ivanoff
 Terry Frost
 Bruce Gillespie
 Leanne Frahm Karen Johnson
 Cathy Cupitt

William Atheling Jr Award
 Katharine and Darren Maxwell, for X-files episode reviews in Frontier
 Sean McMullen and Steven Paulsen, "Australia": Australian Contemporary Fantasy, Encyclopedia of Fantasy (Orbit)1999: Spawncon II, Melbourne
Presented as part of Aussiecon Three

Best Australian Long Fiction
 Pilgrim, Sara Douglass (Harper Collins)
 Feral, Kerry Greenwood (Hodder and Stoughton)
 The Centurion's Empire, Sean McMullen (Tor)
 The Tilecutter's Penny, Caiseal Mór (Random House)
 The Resurrected Man, Sean Williams (Harper Collins)Best Australian Short Fiction
 "The Marsh Runners", Paul Brandon, Dreaming Down Under
 "The Evil Within", Sara Douglass, Dreaming Down Under
 "Dream Until God Burns", Andrew Enstice, Dreaming Down Under
 "The Truth About Weena", David Lake, Dreaming Down Under
 "Queen of Soulmates", Sean McMullen, Dreaming Down Under
 "To Avalon", Jane Routley, Dreaming Down Under

Best Australian Magazine or Anthology
 Altair, Rob Stephenson
 Aurealis, Stephen Higgins & Dirk Strasser
 Dreaming Down-Under, Jack Dann & Janeen Webb (Harper Collins) Eidolon, Jonathan Strahan & Jeremy Byrne
 Fantastic Worlds, Paul Collins (Harper Collins)
 MUP Encyclopedia of Australian Science Fiction, Paul Collins (M.U.P.)

Best Australian Fanzine
 The Captain's Log, Rose Mitchell
 Ethel the Aardvark, Ian Gunn
 Interstellar Ramjet Scoop, Bill Wright
 Metaphysical Review, Bruce Gillespie Out of the Kaje, Karen Johnson
 Thyme, Alan Stewart

Best Australian Fan Artist
 Ian Gunn Robert Jan
 Dick Jenssen
 Marco Nero
 Kerri Valkova

Best Australian Professional Artwork
 Emma Barber, Cover Cannibals of the Fine Light and/or Cover A View Before Dying
 Mark McBride, Cover Fantastic Worlds
 Marilyn Pride, A3 PRs and/or Peregrine Besset
 Nick Stathopoulos, Cover The Man Who Melted and/or Cover Dreaming Down Under
 Shaun Tan, The Rabbits

William Atheling Jr. Award
 Damien Broderick Reviews, The New York Review of Science Fiction
 Paul Collins, MUP Encyclopaedia of Australian Science Fiction
 Steven Paulsen, Contributions to MUP Encyclopedia of Australian Science Fiction
 Jonathan Strahan, Reviews in Locus
 Janeen Webb and Andrew Enstice, Aliens & Savages (Harper Collins)
 Sean Williams & Simon Brown, "No Axis No Boundary", in Altair 1

2000: Swancon 2000, Perth
An awards ceremony was held 16 Dec 2000; the actual trophies were presented later at Swancon 2001.  
Original Nominations

Best Written Work (Professional)
 Paul Collins & Jack Wodhams, "Generation X", Cicada Nov/Dec 1999 
 Stephen Dedman, The Lady of Situations (Ticonderoga Publications)
 Dave Luckett, A Dark Journey (Omnibus)
 Paul Collins, "The Nabakov Affair", in Australian Short Stories #63
 Rory Barnes & Damien Broderick, The Book of Revelation (Harper Collins)

Best Written Work (Unpaid or Fan)
 Colin Sharpe & Kate Langford, "Magical Cream Puff Destiny", in JAMWAF Mangazine (JAFWA)
 Kyla Ward, "Night Cars", in Abaddon #2
 Robin Pen, Eidolist 1999 Reviews, in Eidolist
 Bill Wright, Interstellar Ramjet Scoop
 Alan Stewart, Thyme

Best Professional Production in Any Medium
 Sarah Endacott (ed), Orb 0
 Russell B. Farr (ed), The Lady of Situations (Ticonderoga Publications)
 Roadshow and Warner Brothers, The Matrix
 Paul Collins & Meredith Costain (ed), Spinouts (Pearson Education)
 MP Books, Antique Futures: The Best of Terry Dowling (MP Books)

Best Non-Professional Production in Any Medium
 Jonathan Strahan & Steven Paulsen, The Coode Street Review of Science Fiction
 Team, Twenty3, Swancon 2000 Launch Video
 Cathy Cupitt, The Rhizome Factor
 Danny Heap, The Opening Ceremony Video at Aussiecon Three
 Ion Newcombe, The Antipodean SF website

Best Artwork (Professional.)
 Nick Stathopoulos, The Cover of Antique Futures
 Graeme Bliss, The Cover of Clementine
 Marc McBride, The Cover of Spinouts
 Shaun Tan, The Cover of Orb 0
 Nick Stathopoulos, The Cover of The Aussiecon Three Souvenir Book

Best Artwork (Unpaid or Fan)
 Jeremy Nelson, The Cover of The Rhizome Factor #4
 Colin Sharpe, Illustrations for "The Magical Cream Puff Destiny"
 Dick Jenssen, Body of Work
 Phil Wlodarczyk, Cover of Ethel the Aardvark

William Atheling Award for Criticism or Review
 Van Ikin, Russell Blackford & Sean McMullen, Strange Constellations: A History of Australian Science Fiction (Greenwood)
 Judith Buckrich, George Turner: A Life 1916-1997 (M.U.P.)
 Robert Hood, Articles in i.am ezine
 Janeen Webb & Andrew Enstice, The Fantastic Self (Eidolon Press)
 Jonathan Strahan & Steven Paulsen, The Coode Street Review of Science Fiction

Second Round Nominations and Winners

Best Novel
 Damien Broderick and Rory Barnes, The Book of Revelation
 Greg Egan, Teranesia (Award declined.)
 Richard Harland, Hidden From View
 Dave Luckett, A Dark Victory
 Stephen Dedman, Foreign Bodies
 Jane Routley, Aramaya
 Sean McMullen, Souls in the Great Machine

Best Short Fiction
 Paul Collins, "The Nabakov Affair", in Australian Short Stories 63
 Robert Hood, "Ground Underfoot", in Aurealis 23
 Paul Collins and Jack Wodhams, "Generation X", in Cicada, Nov/Dec 99
 Robert Hood, "Primal Etiquette", in Orb 0
 Chris Lawson, "Written in Blood", in Asimov's, June 1999

Best Collected Work
 Sean Williams, New Adventures in Sci-Fi
 Damien Broderick and David Hartwell, Centaurus
 Terry Dowling, Antique Futures
 Paul Collins and Meredith Costain, Spinouts
 Stephen Dedman, The Lady Of Situations

Best Artwork
 Shaun Tan, Cover to The Coode St Review Of Science Fiction
 Nick Stathopoulos, Cover to Aussiecon 3 Programme Book
 Nick Stathopoulos, Cover to Dreaming Down Under Volume 2, (withdrawn as ineligible (published in 2000))
 Marc McBride, Covers to Spinouts

Best Fan Writer
 Bruce Gillespie
 Alan Stewart
 Karen Johnson
 Robin Pen
 Merv Binns

Best Fan Artist
Brad Foster withdrawn as ineligible (non-Australian)
 Dick Jenssen
 Catriona Sparks

Best Fan Production
 Jonathan Strahan and Steven Paulsen, The Coode St Review Of Science Fiction
 Alan Stewart, Thyme
 Cathy Cupitt, The Rhizome Factor
 Danny Heap, Nick Stathopoulos, Aussiecon 3 Masquerade Ceremony
 Danny Heap, Aussiecon 3 Opening Ceremony Video
 Bill Wright, Interstellar Ramjet Scoop
 Ethel The Aardvark

William Atheling Jr. Award
 Robert Hood, Writings in i.am website
 Tess Williams and Helen Merrick, Women of Other Worlds
 Jonathan Strahan, reviews in Locus
 Russell Blackford, Van Ikin and Sean McMullen, Strange Constellations: A History Of Australian Science Fiction
 Jonathan Strahan and Steven Paulsen, The Coode St Review of Science Fiction

2001: Swancon 2001: Masquerade, Perth

Best Novel
 Cyberskin, Paul Collins (Hybrid Publishers)
 The Miocene Arrow, Sean McMullen (Tor Books)
 Sea as Mirror, Tess Williams (HarperCollins Australia)
 Evergence 2: The Dying Light, Sean Williams and Shane Dix (Ace Books)Best Short Fiction
Included Best Novella or Novelette eligible nominees
 "That Old Black Graffiti", Robert Hood, Tales from the Wasteland, ed. Paul Collins (Hodder Headline)
 "The Devotee", Stephen Dedman, Eidolon 29/30 "The First and Final Game", Deborah Biancotti, Altair #6/7
 "The King with Three Daughters", Russell Blackford, Black Heart, Ivory Bones, eds. Ellen Datlow and Terri Windling (Avon)
 "The Saltimbanques", Terry Dowling, Blackwater Days (Eidolon Publications) "Basic Black", Terry Dowling, Blackwater Days (Eidolon Publications)

Best Collected Work
 Tales from the Wasteland, ed. Paul Collins (Hodder Headline)
 Blackwater Days, Terry Dowling (Eidolon Publications) White Time, Margo Lanagan (Allen and Unwin, Australia)

Best Artwork
 Shaun Tan, The Lost Thing (Lothian Books) Otto Schmidinger, "Space", Stamp Issue, Australia Post
 Marc McBride, Cover to Tales from the Wasteland (Hodder Headline)

Best Fan Writer
 Grant Watson
 Robin Pen Bruce Gillespie
 Alan Stewart

Best Fan Artist
 Grant Watson Jade Todd
 Dick (Ditmar) Jenssen

Best Fan Production
 The Rhizome Factor, ed. Cathy Cupitt
 First Sight, dir. Chris Dickinson
 "The Angriest Video Store Clerk in the World", Grant Watson SwanCon 2001 Launch Video
 The Unrelenting Gaze: SF Commentary # 76, ed. Bruce Gillespie
 Mitch? Short Stories for Short Attention Spans, ed. Mitch?

William Atheling Jr Award for Criticism and Review
 Waking Henson: A Jim Henson Retrospective, Grant Watson and Simon Oxwell The Unrelenting Gaze: SF Commentary # 76, ed. Bruce Gillespie
 Reviews in Locus: The Newspaper of the Science Fiction Field, Jonathan Strahan
 Transrealist Fiction, Damien Broderick (Greenwood)
 "Time Travel, Time Scapes and Timescape", Russell Blackford, The New York Review of SF #150

Best New Talent
 Deborah BiancottiBest Professional Achievement
Two items ruled ineligible; category withdrawn  
 Farscape, Channel 9/Henson Productions
 Spinouts Bronze, eds. Paul Collins & Meredith Costain (Pearson Educational)
 The Lost Thing, Shaun Tan (Lothian Books)

2002: Convergence, Melbourne
Best Novella/Novelette category left off the nomination form
Best Australian Artwork and William Atheling Jr. removed for insufficient nominees

Best Australian Novel
 Eyes of the Calculor, Sean McMullen (Tor)
 Lirael, Garth Nix (Allen and Unwin) The Year of the Intelligent Tigers, Kate Orman (BBC.)

Best Australian Short Fiction
Included Best Novella or Novelette eligible nominees
 "Absolute Uncertainty", Lucy Sussex, F&SF, April 2001 "The Boneyard", Kyla Ward, Gothic.Net, September 2001
 "The Diamond Pit", Jack Dann, Jubilee (Harper Collins) "Rotten Times", Robert Hood, Aurealis 27/28
 "Tower of Wings", Sean McMullen, Analog, December 2001
 "Whispers", Rick Kennett & Paul Collins, Stalking Midnight (Cosmos Books)

Best Australian Collected Work
 Earth is But a Star, Damien Broderick (UWA Press) Jubilee, Jack Dann, (Harper Collins)
 Orb #2, Sarah Endacott
 Stalking Midnight, Paul Collins (Cosmos Books)

Best Fan Writer
Adrian Gaetano withdrew nomination
 Geoff Allshorn
 Deb Biancotti
 Bill Wright
 Bruce GillespieBest Fan Artist
 Miriam English
 Dick Jenssen Cat Sparks

Best Australian Fan Production, Fanzine
 Diverse Universe, Geoff & Miriam
 Fables and Reflections, Lily Chrywenstrom
 Interstellar Ram Jet Scoop, Bill Wright
 SF Commentary, Bruce Gillespie Solar Spectrum, Geoff & Miriam

Best Australian Fan Production, Other
Included Best Australian Fan Achievement eligible nominee
 Consensual, Stephen Dedman, Cathy Cupitt & Elaine Kemp
 JB Resurrection, Garth Thomas
 Mitch? 2, Tarts of the New Millennium, Anthony Mitchell Spaced Out website (www.vicnet.net.au/~spaceout/), Geoff & Miriam
 Tabula-Rasa, David Carroll & Kyla Ward

Best Australian Professional Achievement
 Meredith Costain and Paul Collins, Editing
 Robert Hood for the Young Adult Series, Shades (Hodder Headline)
 Dirk Strasser & Stephen Higgins, for editing and production of Aurealis over so many yearsBest New Talent
 Cat Sparks2003: Swancon 2003, Perth

Best Australian Novel
 Transcension, Damien Broderick
 Echoes of Earth, Sean Williams & Shane Dix Sovereign, Simon Brown
 The Storm Weaver and the Sand, Sean Williams
 Blue Silence, Michelle Marquardt
 The Sky Warden and the Sun, Sean Williams
 Time Past, Maxine McArthur

Best Australian Short Fiction
 "Father Muerte and the Thief", Lee Battersby, Aurealis 29
 "Stealing Alice", Claire McKenna, Agog! Fantastic Fiction
 "Scratches in the Sky", Ben Peek, Agog! Fantastic Fiction
 "Cigarettes and Roses", Ben Peek, Passing Strange
 "King of All and The Metal Sentinel", Deborah Biancotti, Agog! Fantastic Fiction

Best Australian Collected Work
 Machinations, ed. Chris Andrews (CSFG Publishing)
 Agog! Fantastic Fiction, ed. Cat Sparks (Agog! Press) Andromeda Spaceways Inflight Magazine, ed. ASIM Collective
 AustrAlien Absurdities, ed. Chuck McKenzie & Tansy Rayner Roberts (Agog! Press)
 Passing Strange, ed. Bill Congreve (MirrorDanse)

Best Australian Artwork
 Passing Strange Cover, Cat Sparks Andromeda Spaceways Inflight Magazine Cover Issue #3, Les Petersen
 AustrAlien Absurdities Cover, Dion Hamill
 Andromeda Spaceways Inflight Magazine Cover Issue #1, Les Petersen
 Andromeda Spaceways Inflight Magazine Cover Issue #4, Les Petersen
 Andromeda Spaceways Inflight Magazine Cover Issue #2, Les Petersen

Best Australian Fan Writer
 Edwina Harvey
 Chris Lawson
 Robin Pen Dave Cake
 Jonathan Strahan
 Grant Watson
 Bill Wright

Best Australian Fan Artist
 Miriam English
 Les Petersen
 Sarah Xu
 Dick Jenssen
 Colin Sharpe
 Cat SparksBest New Talent
 Lily Chrywenstrom
 Chris Mowbray
 Brendan Duffy
 Lee BattersbyBest Australian Fanzine
 Interstellar Ramjet Scoop, ed. Bill Wright
 Fables & Reflections, ed. Lily Chrywenstrom Australian SF Bullsheet, ed. Edwina Harvey
 Visions, ed. Stephen Thompson
 Antipodean SF, ed. Antipodean Computer Services

Best Australian Production
 Andromeda Spaceways Inflight Magazine Launch Spaced Out Website
 The View From Mt. Pootmootoo
 Eidolon Website

Best Australian Professional Achievement
 Lee Battersby
 Trent Jamieson
 Jonathan StrahanBest Australian Fan Achievement
 Borderlands: That which scares us..., ed. Simon Oxwell, Grant Watson and Anna Hepworth Robin Pen
 Spaced Out Website, ed. Miriam and Geoff

The William Atheling Jr Award for Criticism or Review
 Tama Leaver
 Jonathan Strahan Robin Pen
 Bill Congreve
 Justine Larbalestier

2004: Conflux, Canberra

Best Novel
 The Etched City, K. J. Bishop (Prime Books) The High Lord, Trudi Canavan (HarperCollins)
 Abhorsen, Garth Nix (Allen & Unwin) 
 Fallen Gods, Jonathan Blum & Kate Orman, (Telos Publishing)
 Orphans of Earth, Sean Williams & Shane Dix (HarperCollins)

Best Novella or Novelette
 "Alien Space Nazis Must Die", Chuck McKenzie, Elsewhere
 "Sigmund Freud & the Feral Freeway", Martin Livings, Agog! Terrific Tales
 "Louder Echo", Brendan Duffy, Agog! Terrific Tales
 "Uncharted", Leigh Blackmore, Agog! Terrific Tales
 "Rynemonn", Terry Dowling, Forever Shores
 "La Sentinelle", Lucy Sussex, Southern Blood

Best Short Story
 "The Mark of His Hands", Chuck McKenzie, Orb #5, April 2003
 "The Singular Life of Eddy Dovewater", Deborah Biancotti, Agog! Terrific Tales
 "Kijin Tea", Kyla Ward, Agog! Terrific Tales
 "Room for Improvement", Trudi Canavan, Forever Shores
 "The Truth About Pug Roberts", Kirstyn McDermott, Southern Blood: New Australian Tales of the Supernatural
 "Frozen Charlottes", Lucy Sussex, Forever Shores

Best Collected Work
 Agog! Terrific Tales - Cat Sparks ed. (Agog! Press) Elsewhere - Michael Barry ed. (CSFG Publishing)
 Andromeda Spaceways Inflight Magazine - ASIM Publishing Cooperative
 Southern Blood - Bill Congreve ed. (Sandglass Enterprises)
 Forever Shores - Peter McNamara & Margaret Winch eds. (Wakefield Press)Best Fan Production
 Swancon 2003 Opening Ceremony & Video - Swancon 2003 Committee
 Spaced Out website - Geoff & Miriam
 Elsewhere Book Launch - CSFG "The Mega Panel" - Arron Jacks & Mitch, Continuum 2003
 "Mondys's Perfect Match" - Ian Mond, Continuum 2003

Best Fanzine
 The Australian SF Bullsheet - Edwina Harvey & Edwin Scribner (ed.)
 Three-Eyed Frog - Paul Ewins & Sue Ann Barber
 Fables & Reflections - Lily Chrywenstrom
 Dark Animus - James Cain
 No Award - Russell B. Farr
 Fandom is my life - Danny Oz

Best Fan Writer
 Bruce Gillespie Edwina Harvey
 Danny Oz
 Grant Watson
 Paul Ewins

Best Fan Artist
 Les Petersen - for "Battle Elf" (Conflux) poster Dick Jenssen - for extensive body of work
 Phil Wlodarczyk - for cartoons in Ethel the Aardvark
 Miriam English - for Diverse Universe

Best Artwork
 Greg Bridges - Cover of Axis Trilogy by Sara Douglass
 Les Petersen - Cover of Elsewhere by Michael Barry (ed.)
 Cat Sparks - Cover of Agog! Terrific Tales by Cat Sparks (ed.) Les Petersen - Cover of The High Lord by Trudi Canavan
 Trudi Canavan - Cover of Fables & Reflections 5 by Lily Chrywenstrom (ed.)

Best New Talent
 K. J. Bishop Ben Peek
 Brendan Duffy
 Glenda Larke
 Anna Tambour
 Monica Carroll

William Atheling Jr. Award
 Bruce Gillespie Jonathan Strahan
 Lee Battersby
 Jason Nahrung
 Grant Watson

2005: Thylacon 2005, Hobart

Best Novel
 The Black Crusade, Richard Harland
 Less than Human, Maxine McArthur
 The Crooked Letter, Sean WilliamsBest Collected Work
 Agog! Smashing Stories - Cat Sparks (ed.)
 Black Juice - Margo Lanagan Andromeda Spaceways Inflight Magazine - Lyn Triffitt, Edwina Harvey, Andrew Finch, Zara Baxter, Robbie Matthews & Tehani Croft (ed.)
 Orb 6 - Sarah Endacott (ed.)
 Encounters - Donna Hanson and Maxine McArthur (ed.)

Best Novella or Novelette
 Simon Brown: "Water Babies", Agog! Smashing Stories, April
 Stephen Dedman: "The Whole of the Law", ASIM 13
 Paul Haines: - "The Last Days of Kali Yuga", NFG Magazine, Volume 2 Issue 4, August 2004 Richard Harland: "Catabolic Magic", Aurealis #32
 Cat Sparks: "Home by the Sea", Orb #6, July

Best Short Story
 Deborah Biancotti: "Number 3 Raw Place", Agog! Smashing Stories, April
 Rjurik Davidson: "The Interminable Suffering of Mysterious Mr Wu", Aurealis #33
 Margo Lanagan: - "Singing My Sister Down", Black Juice
 Ben Peek: "R", Agog! Smashing Stories, ed by Cat Sparks

Best Professional Artwork
 Les Petersen: cover of ASIM 12
 Kerri Valkova: - Cover of The Black Crusade (Chimaera Publications)
 Cat Sparks: Agog! Smashing Stories cover
 Les Petersen: Encounters Book Cover
 Les Petersen: cover and internal ASIM 16

Best Professional Achievement
 The Clarion South Team (Fantastic Queensland; Convenors Robert Hoge, Kate Eltham, Robert Dobson & Heather Gammage): negotiating with the US Clarion people, then promoting and establishing Clarion South which gives emerging writer the chance to work with the best in the business.
 Cat Sparks: editing and writing including winning third place in the writers of the future award
 Margo Lanagan: for Black Juice
 Geoff Maloney: for Tales of the Crypto-System, his short story publications
 Sean Williams for The Crooked Letter and efforts in teaching
 Jonathan Strahan for work over the year in internationally published reviews and in editing anthologies

Best Fan Achievement
 Super Happy Robot Hour
 Conflux convention committee
 Continuum 2 convention committee

Best Fan Artist
 Sarah Xu

Best Fan Website/Zine
 Antipodean SF - Ion Newcombe (ed.)
 Australian Science Fiction Bullsheet - ed Edwina Harvey & Ted Scribner Gynaezine - Emma Hawkes and Gina Goddard (ed.)

Best Fan Writer
 Edwina Harvey
 Bruce GillespieBest New Talent
 Chris Barnes
 Stuart Barrow
 Grace Dugan
 Paul Haines Barbara Robson
 Brian Smith

William Atheling Jnr. Award for Criticism or Review
 Robert Hood - review of Weight of Water at HoodReviews, asking "is this film a ghost story?" Jason Nahrung - "Why are publishers afraid of horror?", BAM, Courier-Mail, 20 March 2004 Ben Peek - review of Haruki Murakami's work in the Urban Sprawl Project

2006: Conjure, Brisbane

Best Novel
 Magic or Madness - Justine Larbalestier (Razorbill, 17 March 2005)
 Drowned Wednesday - Garth Nix (Allen & Unwin, Jan 2005)
 Midnight 2: Touching Darkness - Scott Westerfeld (Eos, 1 March 2005)
 Peeps - Scott Westerfeld (Razorbill, 25 August 2005)
 Uglies - Scott Westerfeld (Simon Pulse, 8 February 2005)
 Geodesica: Ascent - Sean Williams & Shane Dix (Ace)Best Collected Work
 Shadowed Realms (www.shadowedrealms.com.au) - Angela Challis & Shane Jiraiya Cummings
 Years Best Australian SF & Fantasy - Bill Congreve & Michelle Marquardt (MirrorDanse)
 Daikaiju! Giant Monster Tales - Robert Hood & Robin Pen (Agog! Press) A Tour Guide in Utopia - Lucy Sussex (MirrorDanse Books)
 The Grinding House - Kaaron Warren, ed. Donna Maree Hanson, (CSFG Publishing)

Best Novella or Novelette
 "Passing of the Minotaurs" - Rjurik Davidson, SciFi.com, April 2005
 "The Red Priest's Homecoming "- Dirk Flinthart, Andromeda Spaceways Inflight Magazine #17
 "Countless Screaming Argonauts" - Chris Lawson, Realms of Fantasy
 "The Memory of Breathing" - Lyn Triffitt (Battersby), Andromeda Spaceways Inflight Magazine #17
 "The Grinding House" - Kaaron Warren, The Grinding House, CSFG PublishingBest Short Story
 "Summa Seltzer Missive" - Deborah Biancotti, Ticonderoga Online #6
 "Leviathan" - Simon Brown, Eidolon SF: Online
 "Once Giants Roamed the Earth" - Rosaleen Love, Daikaju! (Agog! Press)
 "Matricide" - Lucy Sussex, SciFiction
 "Fresh Young Widow" - Kaaron Warren, The Grinding House (CSFG Publishing)Best Professional Artwork
 cover art for The Blood Debt by Sean Williams (HarperCollins Australia) - Greg Bridges
 cover art for The Grinding House by Karon Warren, ed. Donna Maree Hanson (CSFG) - Robin Evans
 cover art for Australian Speculative Fiction: A Genre Overview, ed. Donna Hanson - Nick Stathopoulos Fell #3 - Ben Templesmith (Image Comics)

Best Professional Achievement
 Damien Broderick, Wilson de Silva and Kylie Ahern - Cosmos
 Robert Dobson, Robert Hoge, Kate Eltham, Heather Gammage - Clarion South 2005, Clarion South Workshop Donna Maree Hanson - Australian Speculative Fiction: a genre overview (Australian Speculative Fiction Project)
 Michael Rymer - Screenwriting and directing, Battlestar Galactica Season 2.0, Sci-Fi Channel
 Jonathan Strahan - for editing Best Short Novels: 2005 (SFBC), and co-editing Science Fiction: Best of 2004 (ibooks) and Fantasy: Best of 2004 (ibooks)

Best Fan Production
 Edwina Harvey and Ted Scribner - The Australian Science Fiction Bullsheet website and newsletter Alisa Krasnostein - ASif!: Australian Specfic In Focus (http://asif.dreamhosters.com/doku.php)
 Tony Plank - Inkspillers website (www.inkspillers.com)
 Conflux Committee - Conflux 2 convention
 Continuum Committee - Continuum 3 convention

Best Fan Artist
 Dick Jenssen - Artwork in American fan Earl Kemp's ezines eI 20 (June 2005) and eI 23 (Dec 2005) published via efanzines.com, and Ditmar graphics (cover illustrations) for IRS ( 5 issues) published by Bill Wright
 Elaine Kemp - ConSensual a Trois interior artwork, ConSensual a Trois April 2005
 Shane Parker - Conflux Poster Art, ConfluxBest Fanzine/website
 Horrorscope - Shane Jiraiya Cummings et al.
 Ticonderoga Online - Russell B. Farr et al.
 Interstellar Ramjet Scoop - Bill Wright (ed)

Best Fan Writer
 Shane Jiraiya Cummings - Writer/reviewer, Horror Scope
 Bruce Gillespie - Writer/reviewer, Steam Engine Time and Science Fiction Commentary, *brg*, Earl Kemp's ezines
 Stephanie Gunn - Writer/reviewer, Horror Scope
 Martin Livings - "Skeletor_Hordak", LiveJournal web comic
 Bill Wright - Interstellar Ramjet Scoop, published by Bill Wright

Best New Talent
 Lyn Battersby (nee Triffit)
 Rjurik Davidson
 Karen Miller

The William Atheling Jr. Award
 Ferocious Minds: Polymathy and the New Enlightenment (Wildside Press) - Damien Broderick
 "Divided Kingdom: King Kong vs Godzilla", in King Kong is Back (Benbella Books) - Robert Hood
 "Body Parts", in Borderlands - Chris Lawson
 "PK Dick: The Exhilaration and the Terror", in Borderlands - Rosaleen Love
 "The 2005 Snapshot: Australian Speculative Fiction writers, editors, publishers" - Ben Peek

2007: Convergence 2, Melbourne

Best Novel
 Carnies, Martin Livings (Lothian)
 Prismatic, Edwina Grey (Lothian)
 The Mother, Brett McBean (Lothian)
 The Pilo Family Circus, Will Elliott (ABC Books) The Silver Road, Grace Dugan (Penguin)

Best Novella/Novelette
 "Aftermath", David Conyers, Agog! Ripping Reads (Agog! Press)
 "The Dead of Winter", Stephen Dedman, Weird Tales, #339
 "The Devil in Mr Pussy (Or how I found God inside my wife)", Paul Haines, C0ck (Coeur de Lion Publishing) "The Souls of Dead Soldiers are for Blackbirds, Not Little Boys", Ben Peek, Agog! Ripping Reads, (Agog! Press)
 "Under the Red Sun", Ben Peek, Fantasy Magazine #4, (Prime Books)
 "World's Whackiest Upper Atmosphere Re-Entry Disasters Dating Game", Brendan Duffy, Agog! Ripping Reads (Agog! Press)

Best Short Story
 "Burning from the Inside", Paul Haines, Doorways for the Dispossessed (Prime Books)
 "Cold", Kirstyn McDermott, Shadowed Realms #9
 "Honeymoon", Adam Browne and John Dixon, C0ck, (Coeur de Lion Publishing)
 "Surrender 1: Rope Artist", Deborah Biancotti, Shadowed Realms #9
 "The Bat's Boudoir", Kyla Ward, Shadowed Realms #9
 "The Fear of White", Rjurik Davidson, Borderlands #7Best Collected Work
 Agog! Ripping Reads, Cat Sparks (ed.) (Agog! Press)
 C0ck, Keith Stevenson & Andrew Macrae (eds.)
 Doorways for the Dispossessed, Paul Haines and Geoffrey Maloney (eds.) (Prime Books)
 The Year's Best Australian Science Fiction and Fantasy Vol.2, Bill Congreve & Michelle Marquardt (eds.) (Mirrordanse Books) Eidolon I, Jonathan Strahan and Jeremy Byrne (eds.) (Eidolon Books)

Best Artwork/Artist
 26Lies/1Truth, cover art by Andrew MacRae (Wheatland Press) Agog! Ripping Reads, cover art by Cat Sparks (Agog! Press)
 Daughters of Earth: Feminist Science Fiction in the Twentieth Century cover art by Cat Sparks (Wesleyan University Press)
 The Devoured Earth, cover art by Greg Bridges (HarperCollins Press)
 The Arrival, cover art by Shaun Tan (Lothian)

Best Fan Writer
 Stephanie Gunn
 Shane Jiraiya Cummings
 Danny Oz Miranda Siemienowicz
 Mark Smith-Briggs
 Matthew Tait

Best Fan Artist
 Christopher Johnstone
 Jon SwabeyBest Fan Production
 ASif website, Alisa Krasnostein – Executive Editor Inkspillers website, Tony Plank
 Outland, Directed by John Richards
 Tabula Rasa website, David Carroll
 The Bullsheet website & ezine, Edwina Harvey & Ted Scribner

Best Fanzine
 AntipodeanSF, editor Ion Newcombe
 ASIF – Australian Specfic in Focus, editor Alisa Krasnostein
 The Captain's Log, Austrek clubzine. Edited by Clare McDonald
 Ethel the Aardvark, MSFC clubzine
 HorrorScope, editor Shane Jiraiya CummingsBest Professional Achievement
 Angelia Challis for establishing Brimstone Press as a mass market publisher
 Bill Congreve for Mirrordanse Press and 2 issues of the Australian Year's Best Science Fiction and Fantasy
 Russell B. Farr for Ticonderoga Publications
 Gary Kemble for work on ABC's Articulate and promoting the genre through radio and other mediums
 Alisa Krasnostein for providing new paying markets for readers and writers of both fiction/ non-fiction, art as well as forums for reviews/interviews within the speculative fiction genre, enhancing the profile of Australian speculative fiction.
 Justine Larbalestier, for editing Daughters of Earth: Feminist Science Fiction in the Twentieth Century

Best Fan Achievement
 Marty Young for his work establishing and promoting the Australian Horror Writers Association
 Alisa Krasnostein for establishing ASIf
 Tony Plank for establishing and maintaining the Inkspillers website

Best New Talent
 Stephanie Campisi
 David Conyers
 Shane Jiraiya Cummings
 Alisa Krasnostein
 Brett McBean

William Atheling Jr Award
 Miranda Siemienowicz for her review of Paraspheres appearing in Horrorscope
 Justine Larbalestier for Daughters of Earth: Feminist Science Fiction in the Twentieth Century
 Robert Hood for "Man and Super-Monster: A History of Daikaiju Eiga and its Metaphorical Undercurrents", Borderlands #7
 Grant Watson for "Bad Film Diaries - Sink or Swim: The Truth Behind Waterworld", Borderlands #8
 Kathryn Linge for her review "Through Soft Air", ASif

2008: State of the Art: Swancon 2008, Perth

Best Novel
 The Company of the Dead, David Kowalski (PanMacmillan)
 Extras, Scott Westerfeld (Simon & Schuster)
 Dark Space, Marianne de Pierres (Orbit)
 Saturn Returns, Sean Williams (Orbit) Magic's Child, Justine Larbalestier (Penguin)
 The Darkness Within, Jason Nahrung (Hachette Livre)

Best Novella/Novelette
 "Yamabushi Kaidan and the Smoke Dragon", Shane Jiraiya Cummings, Fantastic Wonder Stories, edited by Russell B. Farr
 "Where is Brisbane and How Many Times Do I Get There?", Paul Haines, Fantastical Journeys to Brisbane, edited by Geoffrey Maloney, Trent Jamieson and Zoran Zivkovic
 "The Bluebell Vengeance", Tansy Rayner Roberts, Andromeda Spaceways Inflight Magazine #28 edited by Zara Baxter
 "A Lady of Adestan", Cat Sparks, Orb #7, edited by Sarah Endacott Cenotaxis, Sean Williams (MonkeyBrain Books)
 "Sir Hereward and Mister Fitz Go To War Again", Garth Nix Jim Baen's Universe

Best Short Story
 "The Dark and What It Said", Rick Kennett Andromeda Spaceways Inflight Magazine #28, edited by Zara Baxter "Domine", Rjurik Davidson, Aurealis #37, edited by Stephen Higgins and Stuart Mayne
 "A Scar for Leida", Deb Biancotti, Fantastic Wonder Stories, edited by Russell B. Farr
 "Bad Luck, Trouble, Death and Vampire Sex", Garth Nix, Eclipse One, edited by Jonathan Strahan
 "The Sun People", Sue Isle, Shiny #2, edited by Alisa Krasnostein, Ben Payne and Tansy Rayner Roberts
 "His Lipstick Minx", Kaaron Warren, The Workers' Paradise, edited by Russell B. Farr and Nick Evans

Best Collected Work
 Orb #7, Sarah Endacott (ed.) (Orb Publications)
 The Workers' Paradise, Russell B. Farr and Nick Evans (eds.) (Ticonderoga Publications)
 New Ceres, Alisa Krasnstein (ed.) (Twelfth Planet Press)
 The New Space Opera,  Jonathan Strahan (ed.) (HarperCollins Australia) Fantastic Wonder Stories, Russell B. Farr (ed.) (Ticonderoga Publications)Best Artwork/Artist
 Daryl Lindquist for the ASIM #28 cover
 Nick Stathopolous for the Daikaju #3 cover
 Eleanor Clark for ASIM #31 internal art
 Amanda Rainey for The Workers' Paradise cover
 Nick Stathopolous for the Rynemonn cover Eleanor Clark for ASIM #30 internal art

Best Fan Writer
 Alexandra Pierce for Last Short Story on Earth and for ASiF! reviews
 Shane Jiraiya Cummings for Horrorscope
 Grant Watson for the 'angriest' Livejournal
 Rob Hood for film reviews on his websiteBest Fan Art
 "Exterminate!" Dalek Postcards - Kathryn Linge 'Nights Edge' Convention Poster Art - John Parker

Best Fan Production
 2007 Snap Shot Project - interviews with influential members of the Australian speculative fiction scene conducted by Alisa Krasnostein, Ben Payne, Alexandra Pierce, Tansy Rayner Roberts, Katherine Linge, Kaaron Warren and Rosie Clark Inkspillers Website - Tony Plank
 "The Liminal" short film - directed by Claire McKenna
 Daikaju Limerick Competition - Robert Hood on his website
 Talking Squid Website - Chris Lawson

Best Fanzine
 The Australian Science Fiction Bullsheet, Ted Scribner and Edwina Harvey (eds.)
 Not If You Were the Last Short Story on Earth, Alisa Krasnostein, Ben Payne, Alexandra Pierce, Tansy Rayner Roberts (eds.) Steam Engine Time, edited by Bruce Gillespie
 Horrorscope, Shane Jiraiya Cummings (ed.)

Best Professional Achievement
 Gary Kemble for his continued coverage of speculative fiction on Articulate and ABC news online
 Russell B. Farr for Ticonderoga Publications; in 2007, Russell produced an issue of Ticonderoga Online, The Workers' Paradise and Fantastic Wonder Stories, which produced five Aurealis Award nominees
 Jonathan Strahan for a prolific body of work editing The Jack Vance Treasury, The Best Science Fiction and Fantasy of the Year, Best Short Novels of 2007, The New Space Opera, Ascendancies: The Best of Bruce Sterling and Eclipse One: New Science Fiction and Fantasy
 Andromeda Spaceways Publishing Co-Operative Ltd for five issues in 2007, including three electronic Best Of anthologies Jonathan Strahan, Garth Nix, Deb Biancotti and Trevor Stafford for compiling and promoting the new Australian Fantasy and SF catalogue in the United States to increase awareness and appreciation of forthcoming Australian SF and to expand creative and professional opportunities for writers

Best Fan Achievement
 Alisa Krasnostein for ASiF! Australian Speculative Fiction in Focus
 Marty Young for his work as President of the Australian Horror Writers Association
 John Parker, Sarah Parker and Sarah Xu for Night's Edge Convention
 Sarah Xu for the CyPEC Cyber-feminist Conference held as part of Night's Edge convention

Best New Talent
 Angela Slatter
 Jason Nahrung
 Nathan Burrage
 Tehani Wessely
 David Conyers

William Atheling Jr Award
 Ian Nichols for "Seriatem, Seriatum, omnia Seriatem" (Published by Andromeda Spaceways Inflight Magazine #30, edited by Robbie Matthews)
 Tansy Rayner Roberts and Alexandra Pierce for review of Elizabeth Bear's New Amsterdam (Published as Podcast #2 on ASiF!)
 Jonathan Strahan for editorial for The New Space Opera (Published in The New Space Opera by HarperCollins Australia)
 Grant Watson for "The Bad Film Diaries" (Published in Borderlands #9)
 Ben Peek for the Aurealis Awards Shortlist Feature Article (Published on ASiF!)
 Shane Jiraiya Cummings for review of David Conyers' and John Sunseri's The Spiraling Worm (Published on Horrorscope)
 Ian Nichols for "The Shadow Thief" (Published by The West Australian Weekend Magazine on 22 September 2007)

2009: Conjecture, Adelaide

Best Novel
 Hal Spacejock: No Free Lunch, Simon Haynes 
 Daughter of Moab, Kim Westwood
 Earth Ascendant, Sean Williams
 Fivefold, Nathan Burrage
 How to Ditch Your Fairy, Justine Larbalestier
 Tender Morsels, Margo LanaganBest Novella/Novelette
 "Creeping in Reptile Flesh", Robert Hood
 "Soft Viscosity", David Conyers
 "Angel Rising", Dirk Flinthart
 "Night Heron's Curse", Thoraiya Dyer
 "Painlessness", Kirstyn McDermottBest Short Story
 "The Goosle", Margo Lanagan "This Is Not My Story", Dirk Flinthart "Pale Dark Soldier", Deborah Biancotti
 "Sammarynda Deep", Cat Sparks
 "Her Collection of Intimacy", Paul Haines
 "Ass-Hat Magic Spider", Scott Westerfeld
 "Moments of Dying", Robert Hood

Best Collected Work
 Black: Australian Dark Culture Magazine, edited by Angela Challis
 Creeping in Reptile Flesh, Robert Hood
 2012, edited by Alisa Krasnostein and Ben Payne
 Canterbury 2100, edited by Dirk Flinthart
 Midnight Echo, edited by Kirstyn McDermott and Ian Mond
 Dreaming Again, edited by Jack Dann The Starry Rift, edited by Jonathan Strahan

Best Artwork
 Tales from Outer Suburbia, Shaun Tan The Last Realm, Book 1: Dragonscarpe, Michal Dutkiewicz
 Gallery in Black Box, Andrew McKiernan
 Aurealis #40 cover, Adam Duncan
 Creeping in Reptile Flesh cover, Cat Sparks
 2012 cover, Cat Sparks

Best Fan Writer
 Mark Smith-Briggs, for work in Horrorscope
 Edwina Harvey, for work in The Australian Science Fiction Bullsheet
 Chuck McKenzie, for work in Horrorscope
 Craig Bezant, for work in Horrorscope
 Brenton Tomlinson, for work in Horrorscope
 Robert Hood, for work in Undead Backbrain Best Fan Artist
 Cat Sparks, for Scary Food Cookbook
 Anna Tambour, for "Box of Noses" and other works
 Rachel Holkner, for "Gumble Soft" toy and other works
 Tansy Rayner Roberts, for "Daleks are a Girl's Best Friend"
 Andrew McKiernan, for body of work
 David Schembri, for body of work
 Nancy Lorenz, for body of work

Best Fan Publication in Any Medium
 ASif! (Australian Specfic in Focus), edited by Alisa Krasnostein and Gene Melzack  Horrorscope, edited by Shane Jiraiya Cummings et al.
 The Australian SF Bullsheet, edited by Edwina Harvey and Ted Scribner
 Scary Food Cookbook, edited by Cat Sparks

Best Achievement
 Angela Challis, for Black: Australian Dark Culture Magazine and Brimstone Press Damien Broderick, for fiction editing in Cosmos
 Talie Helene, for her work as AHWA News Editor
 James "Jocko" Allen and KRin Pender-Gunn, for "The Gunny Project: A tribute to Ian Gunn 1959-1998"
 Steven Clark, for Tasmaniac Productions
 James Doig, for preserving colonial Australian horror fiction and editing Australian Gothic and Australian Nightmares
 Marty Young and the AHWA Committee, for promoting Australian horror through the AHWA

Best New Talent
 Amanda Pillar
 Jason Fischer
 Peter M. Ball
 Felicity Dowker Gary Kemble

William Atheling Jr Award
 Kim Wilkins, for "Popular genres and the Australian literary community: the case of fantasy fiction" Shane Jiraiya Cummings, for "Dark Suspense: The End of the Line"
 Grant Watson, for "Bad Film Diaries - Sometimes the Brand Burns: Tim Burton and the Planet of the Apes"
 Robert Hood, for "George A. Romero: Master of the Living Dead"

2010: Dudcon III, Melbourne

Best Novel
 Leviathan, Scott Westerfeld (Penguin)
 Liar, Justine Larbalestier (Bloomsbury)
 World Shaker, Richard Harland (Allen & Unwin)
 Slights, Kaaron Warren (Angry Robot Books) Life Through Cellophane, Gillian Polack (Eneit Press)

Best Novella or Novelette
 "Siren Beat", Tansy Rayner Roberts (Twelfth Planet Press)
 "Black Water", David Conyers, Jupiter
 "After the World: Gravesend", Jason Fischer (Black House Comics)
 Horn, Peter M. Ball (Twelfth Planet Press)
 "Wives", Paul Haines, X6 (Coeur de Lion)Best Short Story
 "The Piece of Ice in Ms Windermere's Heart", Angela Slatter, New Ceres Nights (Twelfth Planet Press)
 "Six Suicides", Deborah Biancotti, A Book of Endings (Twelfth Planet Press)
 "Black Peter"	Marty Young, Festive Fear (Tasmaniac Publications)
 "Seventeen", Cat Sparks, Masques (CSFG) "Tontine Mary", Kaaron Warren, New Ceres Nights (Twelfth Planet Press)
 "Prosperine When it Sizzles", Tansy Rayner Roberts, New Ceres Nights (Twelfth Planet Press)

Best Collected Work
 The New Space Opera 2, edited by Jonathan Strahan and Gardner Dozois (HarperCollins)
 New Ceres Nights, edited by Alisa Krasnostein and Tehani Wessely  (Twelfth Planet Press)
 Slice Of Life, Paul Haines, edited by Geoffrey Maloney (The Mayne Press) A Book of Endings, Deborah Biancotti, edited by Alisa Krasnostein and Ben Payne (Twelfth Planet Press)
 Eclipse Three, edited by Jonathan Strahan (Night Shade Books)

Best Artwork
 Cover art, New Ceres Nights (Twelfth Planet Press), Dion Hamill
 Cover art, The Whale's Tale (Peggy Bright Books), Eleanor Clarke
 Cover art and illustrations, Shards: Short Sharp Tales (Brimstone Press), Andrew J. McKiernan
 Cover art, Andromeda Spaceways Inflight Magazine #42, Lewis Morley Cover art, Horn (Twelfth Planet Press), Dion Hamill
 Cover art, Masques (CSFG), Mik Bennett

Best Fan Writer
 Tansy Rayner Roberts for body of work
 Chuck McKenzie for work in Horrorscope
 Robert Hood for Undead Backbrain (roberthood.net/blog)
 Tehani Wessely for body of work
 Bruce Gillespie for work in Steam Engine Time

Best Fan Artist
 Dave Schembri	for work in Midnight Echo
 Kathleen Jennings for body of work
 Dick Jenssen for body of workBest Fan Publication in Any Medium
 Interstellar Ramjet Scoop, edited by Bill Wright
 A Writer Goes on a Journey (http://awritergoesonajourney.com), edited by Nyssa Pascoe et al.
 ASif! (http://asif.dreamhosters.com/), edited by Alisa Krasnostein, Gene Melzack et al.
 Australian Science Fiction Bullsheet (http://bullsheet.sf.org.au), edited by Edwina Harvey and Ted Scribner
 Steam Engine Time, edited by Bruce Gillespie and Janine StinsonBest Achievement
 Alisa Krasnostein, Liz Grzyb, Tehani Wessely, Cat Sparks and Kate Williams for the New Ceres Nights book launch
 H. Gibbens for the Gamers' Quest CGI-animated book trailer (https://www.youtube.com/watch?v=0vCC-l34Fgo)
 Ruth Jenkins and Cathy Jenkins-Rutherford for the children's program at Conjecture
 Amanda Rainey	for the cover design of Siren Beat/Roadkill (Twelfth Planet Press)
 Gillian Polack et al. for the Southern Gothic banquet at ConfluxBest New Talent
 Pete Kempshall
 Kathleen Jennings
 Thoraiya Dyer
 Jason Fischer
 Simon Petrie
 Christopher Green
 Peter M. BallWilliam Atheling Jr Award for Criticism or Review
 Chuck McKenzie for "The Dead Walk! … Into a Bookstore Near You", Eye of Fire #1 (Brimstone Press)
 Ian Mond for reviews on his blog (http://mondyboy.livejournal.com)
 Grant Watson for reviews and articles for Eiga: Asian Cinema (http://www.eigaasiancinema.com)
 Helen Merrick for The Secret Feminist Cabal: a cultural history of science fiction feminisms (Aqueduct Press)2011: Swancon Thirty Six | Natcon Fifty, Perth
There was a version of the ballot on which the cover design by Lisa L. Hannett for The Girl With No Hands was nominated as cover art under Best Artwork. When it was reclassified as cover design under Best Achievement, cover art by Andrew J. McKiernon for Savage Menace and Other Poems of Horror got onto the ballot under Best Artwork.

 Best Novel 
 Death Most Definite, Trent Jamieson (Hachette)
 Madigan Mine, Kirstyn McDermott (Pan Macmillan)
 Power and Majesty, Tansy Rayner Roberts (Voyager)
 Stormlord Rising, Glenda Larke (Voyager)
 Walking the Tree, Kaaron Warren (Angry Robot Books)

Best Novella or Novelette 
 "Acception", Tessa Kum (Eneit Press)
 "All the Clowns in Clowntown", Andrew J McKiernan (Brimstone Press)
 "Bleed", Peter M. Ball (Twelfth Planet Press)
 "Her Gallant Needs", Paul Haines (Twelfth Planet Press)
 "The Company Articles of Edward Teach", Thoraiya Dyer (Twelfth Planet Press)

Best Short Story 
 "All the Love in the World", Cat Sparks, Sprawl (Twelfth Planet Press)
 "Bread and Circuses", Felicity Dowker, Scary Kisses (Ticonderoga Publications)
 "One Saturday Night With Angel", Peter M. Ball, Sprawl (Twelfth Planet Press)
 "She Said", Kirstyn McDermott, Scenes From the Second Storey (Morrigan Books)
 "The House of Nameless", Jason Fischer, Writers of the Future XXVI (Galaxy Press)
 "The February Dragon", Angela Slatter and Lisa L. Hannett, Scary Kisses (Ticonderoga Publications)

Best Collected Work 
 Baggage, edited by Gillian Polack (Eneit Press)
 Macabre: A Journey through Australia's Darkest Fears, edited by Angela Challis and Marty Young (Brimstone Press)
 Scenes from the Second Storey, edited by Amanda Pillar and Pete Kempshall (Morrigan Books)
 Sprawl, edited by Alisa Krasnostein (Twelfth Planet Press)
 Worlds Next Door, edited by Tehani Wessely (FableCroft Publishing)

Best Artwork 
 Cover art, The Angaelien Apocalypse/The Company Articles of Edward Teach (Twelfth Planet Press), Dion Hamill
 Cover art, Australis Imaginarium (FableCroft Publishing), Shaun Tan
 Cover art, Dead Sea Fruit (Ticonderoga Publications), Olga Read
 Cover art, Savage Menace and Other Poems of Horror (P'rea Press), Andrew J McKiernan 
 "The Lost Thing" short film (Passion Pictures), Andrew Ruhemann and Shaun Tan

Best Fan Writer 
 Robert Hood, for Undead Backbrain
 Chuck McKenzie, for work in Horrorscope
 Alexandra Pierce, for body of work including reviews at Australian Speculative Fiction in Focus
 Tehani Wessely, for body of work including reviews at Australian Speculative Fiction in Focus

Best Fan Artist 
 Rachel Holkner, for Continuum 6 props
 Dick Jenssen, for cover art of Interstellar Ramjet Scoop
 Amanda Rainey, for Swancon 36 logo

Best Fan Publication in Any Medium 
 Australian Speculative Fiction in Focus, edited by Alisa Krasnostein et al.
 Bad Film Diaries podcast, Grant Watson
 Galactic Suburbia podcast, Alisa Krasnostein, Tansy Rayner Roberts, and Alex Pierce Terra Incognita podcast, Keith Stevenson
 The Coode Street podcast, Gary K. Wolfe and Jonathan Strahan
 The Writer and the Critic podcast, Kirstyn McDermott and Ian Mond

 Best Achievement 
 Lisa L. Hannett, cover design for The Girl With No Hands and Other Tales (Ticonderoga Publications) 
 Helen Merrick and Andrew Milner, Academic Stream for Aussiecon 4
 Amanda Rainey, cover design for Scary Kisses (Ticonderoga Publications)
 Kyla Ward, Horror Stream and The Nightmare Ball for Aussiecon 4
 Grant Watson and Sue Ann Barber, Media Stream for Aussiecon 4
 Alisa Krasnostein, Kathryn Linge, Rachel Holkner, Alexandra Pierce, Tansy Rayner Roberts, and Tehani Wessely, Snapshot 2010

Best New Talent 
 Thoraiya Dyer
 Lisa L. Hannett
 Patty Jansen
 Kathleen Jennings
 Pete Kempshall

William Atheling Jr Award for Criticism or Review 
 Leigh Blackmore, for "Marvels and Horrors: Terry Dowling's Clowns at Midnight" in 21st Century Gothic (Scarecrow Press)
 Damien Broderick, for editing Skiffy and Mimesis: More Best of Australian Science Fiction Review (Wildside Press)
 Ross Murray, for "The Australian Dream Becomes Nightmare - Visions of Suburbia in Australian Science Fiction" in Andromeda Spaceways Inflight Magazine 44. 
 Tansy Rayner Roberts, for "A Modern Woman's Guide to Classic Who"

2012, Continuum 8: Craftonomicon, Melbourne

Best Novel 
 Debris (The Veiled Worlds 1), Jo Anderton (Angry Robot)
 Burn Bright, Marianne de Pierres (Random House Australia)
 The Shattered City (Creature Court 2), Tansy Rayner Roberts (HarperCollins)
 Mistification, Kaaron Warren (Angry Robot)
 The Courier's New Bicycle, Kim Westwood (HarperCollins) Best Novella or Novelette 
 "And the Dead Shall Outnumber the Living", Deborah Biancotti (Ishtar)
 "Above", Stephanie Campisi (Above/Below)
 "The Past is a Bridge Best Left Burnt", Paul Haines (The Last Days of Kali Yuga) "Below", Ben Peek (Above/Below)
 "Julia Agrippina's Secret Family Bestiary", Tansy Rayner Roberts (Love and Romanpunk)
 "The Sleeping and the Dead", Cat Sparks (Ishtar)

 Best Short Story 
 "Bad Power", Deborah Biancotti (Bad Power)
 "Breaking the Ice", Thoraiya Dyer (Cosmos 37)
 "The Last Gig of Jimmy Rucker", Martin Livings & Talie Helene (More Scary Kisses)
 "The Patrician", Tansy Rayner Roberts (Love and Romanpunk) "Alchemy", Lucy Sussex (Thief of Lives)
 "All You Can Do Is Breathe", Kaaron Warren (Blood and Other Cravings)

 Best Collected Work 
 Bad Power, Deborah Biancotti (Twelfth Planet)
 The Last Days of Kali Yuga, Paul Haines (Brimstone) Nightsiders, Sue Isle (Twelfth Planet)
 Ishtar, Amanda Pillar & K.V. Taylor, eds. (Gilgamesh)
 Love and Romanpunk, Tansy Rayner Roberts (Twelfth Planet)

 Best Artwork 
 "Finishing School", Kathleen Jennings, in Steampunk!: An Anthology of Fantastically Rich and Strange Stories (Candlewick) Cover art for The Freedom Maze (Small Beer), Kathleen Jennings

 Best Fan Writer 
 Bruce Gillespie, for body of work including "The Golden Age of Fanzines is Now", and SF Commentary 81 & 82
 Robin Pen, for "The Ballad of the Unrequited Ditmar" Alexandra Pierce, for body of work including reviews at Australian Speculative Fiction in Focus, Not If You Were The Last Short Story On Earth, and Randomly Yours, Alex
 Tansy Rayner Roberts, for body of work including reviews at Australian Speculative Fiction in Focus, and Not If You Were The Last Short Story On Earth
 Sean Wright, for body of work including "Authors and Social Media" series in Adventures of a Bookonaut

 Best Fan Artist 
 Rebecca Ing, for work in Scape
 Kathleen Jennings, for work in Errantry, including "The Dalek Game" Dick Jenssen, for body of work including work in IRS, Steam Engine Time, SF Commentary, and Scratchpad
 Lisa Rye, for "Steampunk Portal" series
 Rhianna Williams, for work in Nullas Anxietas Convention Programme Book

 Best Fan Publication in Any Medium 
 SF Commentary, Bruce Gillespie, ed.
 Galactic Chat podcast, Alisa Krasnostein, Tansy Rayner Roberts & Sean Wright
 Galactic Suburbia podcast, Alisa Krasnostein, Tansy Rayer Roberts, & Alex Pierce
 The Writer and the Critic podcast, Kirstyn McDermott & Ian Mond The Coode Street Podcast, Gary K. Wolfe & Jonathan Strahan

 Best New Talent 
 Joanne Anderton Alan Baxter
 Steve Cameron

 William Atheling Jr. Award for Criticism or Review 
 Russell Blackford, for "Currently reading: Jonathan Strange and Mr. Norrell by Susanna Clarke", in Metamagician and the Hellfire Club
 Damien Broderick & Van Ikin, for editing Warriors of the Tao: The Best of Science Fiction: A Review of Speculative Literature
 Liz Grzyb & Talie Helene, for "2010: The Year in Review", in The Year's Best Australian Fantasy and Horror 2010
 David McDonald, Tansy Rayner Roberts & Tehani Wessely, for "Reviewing New Who" series, in A Conversational Life
 Alexandra Pierce & Tehani Wessely, for reviews of Vorkosigan Saga, in Randomly Yours, Alex

2013, Conflux 9, Canberra

Best Novel

 Sea Hearts, Margo Lanagan (Allen & Unwin) 
 Bitter Greens, Kate Forsyth (Random House Australia) 	 
 Suited (The Veiled Worlds 2), Jo Anderton (Angry Robot) 	 
 Salvage, Jason Nahrung (Twelfth Planet Press) 	 
 Perfections, Kirstyn McDermott (Xoum) 	 
 The Corpse-Rat King, Lee Battersby (Angry Robot)

Best Novella or Novelette

 "Flight 404", Simon Petrie, in Flight 404/The Hunt for Red Leicester (Peggy Bright Books) 	 
 "Significant Dust", Margo Lanagan, in Cracklescape (Twelfth Planet Press) 	 
 "Sky", Kaaron Warren, in Through Splintered Walls (Twelfth Planet Press)Best Short Story

 "Sanaa's Army", Joanne Anderton, in Bloodstones (Ticonderoga Publications) 	 
 "The Wisdom of Ants", Thoraiya Dyer, in Clarkesworld 75
 "The Bone Chime Song", Joanne Anderton, in Light Touch Paper Stand Clear (Peggy Bright Books) 	 
 "Oracle's Tower", Faith Mudge, in To Spin a Darker Stair (FableCroft Publishing)

Best Collected Work

 Cracklescape by Margo Lanagan, edited by Alisa Krasnostein (Twelfth Planet Press) 	 
 Epilogue, edited by Tehani Wessely (FableCroft Publishing) 	 
 Through Splintered Walls by Kaaron Warren, edited by Alisa Krasnostein (Twelfth Planet Press) Light Touch Paper Stand Clear, edited by Edwina Harvey and Simon Petrie (Peggy Bright Books) 	 
 Midnight and Moonshine by Lisa L. Hannett and Angela Slatter, edited by Russell B. Farr (Ticonderoga Publications) 	 
 The Year's Best Australian Fantasy and Horror 2011, edited by Liz Grzyb and Talie Helene (Ticonderoga Publications)

Best Artwork

 Cover art, Nick Stathopoulos, for Andromeda Spaceways Inflight Magazine 56 (ASIM Collective) 	 
 Cover art, Kathleen Jennings, for Midnight and Moonshine (Ticonderoga Publications) Illustrations, Adam Browne, for Pyrotechnicon (Coeur de Lion Publishing) 	 
 Cover art and illustrations, Kathleen Jennings, for To Spin a Darker Stair (FableCroft Publishing) 	 
 Cover art, Les Petersen, for Light Touch Paper Stand Clear (Peggy Bright Books)

Best Fan Writer

 Alex Pierce, for body of work including reviews in Australian Speculative Fiction in Focus 	 
 Tansy Rayner Roberts, for body of work including reviews in Not If You Were The Last Short Story On Earth
 Grant Watson, for body of work including the "Who50" series in The Angriest 	 
 Sean Wright, for body of work including reviews in Adventures of a Bookonaut

Best Fan Artist

 Kathleen Jennings, for body of work including "The Dalek Game" and "The Tamsyn Webb Sketchbook"

Best Fan Publication in Any Medium

 The Writer and the Critic, Kirstyn McDermott and Ian Mond Galactic Suburbia, Alisa Krasnostein, Tansy Rayner Roberts, and Alex Pierce 	 
 Antipodean SF, Ion Newcombe 	 
 The Coode Street Podcast, Jonathan Strahan and Gary K. Wolfe 	 
 "Snapshot 2012", Alisa Krasnostein, Kathryn Linge, David McDonald, Helen Merrick, Ian Mond, Jason Nahrung et al. 	 
 Australian Speculative Fiction in Focus, Alisa Krasnostein, Tehani Wessely, et al. 	 
 Galactic Chat, Alisa Krasnostein, Tansy Rayner Roberts, and Sean Wright

Best New Talent

 David McDonald Faith Mudge 	 
 Steve Cameron 	 
 Stacey Larner

William Atheling Jr Award for Criticism or Review

 Alisa Krasnostein, Kathryn Linge, David McDonald, and Tehani Wessely, for review of Mira Grant's Newsflesh, in ASIF	
 Tansy Rayner Roberts, for "Historically Authentic Sexism in Fantasy. Let's Unpack That.", in tor.com
 David McDonald, Tansy Rayner Roberts, and Tehani Wessely, for the "New Who in Conversation" series 	
 Liz Grzyb and Talie Helene, for "The Year in Review", in The Year's Best Australian Fantasy and Horror 2011	
 Rjurik Davidson, for "An Illusion in the Game for Survival", a review of Reamde by Neal Stephenson, in The Age

2014, Continuum X, Melbourne

Best Novel

 Ink Black Magic, Tansy Rayner Roberts (FableCroft Publishing)
 Fragments of a Broken Land: Valarl Undead, Robert Hood (Wildside Press) The Beckoning, Paul Collins (Damnation Books)
 Trucksong, Andrew Macrae (Twelfth Planet Press)
 The Only Game in the Galaxy (The Maximus Black Files 3), Paul Collins (Ford Street Publishing)

Best Novella or Novelette

 "Prickle Moon", Juliet Marillier, in Prickle Moon (Ticonderoga Publications)
 "The Year of Ancient Ghosts", Kim Wilkins, in The Year of Ancient Ghosts (Ticonderoga Publications)
 "By Bone-Light", Juliet Marillier, in Prickle Moon (Ticonderoga Publications)
 "The Home for Broken Dolls", Kirstyn McDermott, in Caution: Contains Small Parts (Twelfth Planet Press) "What Amanda Wants", Kirstyn McDermott, in Caution: Contains Small Parts (Twelfth Planet Press)

Best Short Story

 "Mah Song", Joanne Anderton, in The Bone Chime Song and Other Stories (FableCroft Publishing)
 "Air, Water and the Grove", Kaaron Warren, in The Lowest Heaven (Jurassic London)
 "Seven Days in Paris", Thoraiya Dyer, in Asymmetry (Twelfth Planet Press)
 "Scarp", Cat Sparks, in The Bride Price (Ticonderoga Publications) "Not the Worst of Sins", Alan Baxter, in Beneath Ceaseless Skies 133 (Firkin Press)
 "Cold White Daughter", Tansy Rayner Roberts, in One Small Step (FableCroft Publishing)

Best Collected Work

 The Back of the Back of Beyond, Edwina Harvey, edited by Simon Petrie (Peggy Bright Books)
 Asymmetry , Thoraiya Dyer, edited by Alisa Krasnostein (Twelfth Planet Press)
 Caution: Contains Small Parts, Kirstyn McDermott, edited by Alisa Krasnostein (Twelfth Planet Press)
 The Bone Chime Song and Other Stories, Joanne Anderton, edited by Tehani Wesseley (FableCroft Publishing)
 The Bride Price, Cat Sparks, edited by Russell B. Farr (Ticonderoga Publications)Best Artwork

 Cover art, Eleanor Clarke, for The Back of the Back of Beyond by Edwina Harvey (Peggy Bright Books)
 Illustrations, Kathleen Jennings, for Eclipse Online (Nightshade Books)
 Cover art, Shauna O'Meara, for Next, edited by Simon Petrie and Rob Porteous (CSFG Publishing)
 Cover art, Cat Sparks, for The Bride Price by Cat Sparks (Ticonderoga Publications)
 Rules of Summer, Shaun Tan (Hachette Australia) Cover art, Pia Ravenari, for Prickle Moon by Juliet Marillier (Ticonderoga Publications)

Best Fan Writer

 Tsana Dolichva, for body of work, including reviews and interviews in Tsana's Reads and Reviews
 Sean Wright, for body of work, including reviews in Adventures of a Bookonaut
 Grant Watson, for body of work, including reviews in The Angriest
 Foz Meadows, for body of work, including reviews in Shattersnipe: Malcontent & Rainbows
 Alexandra Pierce, for body of work, including reviews in Randomly Yours, Alex
 Tansy Rayner Roberts, for body of work, including essays and reviews at www.tansyrr.com

Best Fan Artist

 Nalini Haynes, for body of work, including "Defender of the Faith", "The Suck Fairy", "Doctor Who vampire" and "The Last Cyberman" in Dark Matter
 Kathleen Jennings, for body of work, including "Illustration Friday"
 Dick Jenssen, for body of work, including cover art for Interstellar Ramjet Scoop and SF Commentary

Best Fan Publication in Any Medium

 Dark Matter Zine, Nalini Haynes
 SF Commentary, Bruce Gillespie
 The Writer and the Critic, Kirstyn McDermott and Ian Mond
 Galactic Chat Podcast, Sean Wright, Alex Pierce, Helen Stubbs, David McDonald, and Mark Webb The Coode Street Podcast, Gary K. Wolfe and Jonathan Strahan
 Galactic Suburbia, Alisa Krasnostein, Alex Pierce, and Tansy Rayner Roberts

Best New Talent

 Michelle Goldsmith
 Zena Shapter Faith Mudge
 Jo Spurrier
 Stacey Larner

William Atheling Jr Award for Criticism or Review

 Reviews in Randomly Yours, Alex, Alexandra Pierce
 "Things Invisible: Human and Ab-Human in Two of Hodgson's Carnacki stories", Leigh Blackmore, in Sargasso: The Journal of William Hope Hodgson Studies #1 edited by Sam Gafford (Ulthar Press)
 Galactic Suburbia Episode 87: Saga Spoilerific Book Club, Alisa Krasnostein, Alex Pierce, and Tansy Rayner Roberts The Reviewing New Who series, David McDonald, Tansy Rayner Roberts, and Tehani Wessely "A Puppet's Parody of Joy: Dolls, Puppets and Mannikins as Diabolical Other", Leigh Blackmore, in Ramsey Campbell: Critical Essays on the Master of Modern Horror edited by Gary William Crawford (Scarecrow Press)
 "That was then, this is now: how my perceptions have changed", George Ivanoff, in Doctor Who and Race edited by Lindy Orthia (Intellect Books)

2015, Swancon 40, Perth

Best Novel
 The Lascar's Dagger, Glenda Larke (Hachette) Bound (Alex Caine 1), Alan Baxter (Voyager)
 Clariel, Garth Nix (HarperCollins)
 Thief's Magic (Millennium's Rule 1), Trudi Canavan (Hachette Australia) The Godless (Children 1), Ben Peek (Tor UK)

Best Novella or Novelette
 "The Ghost of Hephaestus", Charlotte Nash, in Phantazein (FableCroft Publishing)
 "The Legend Trap", Sean Williams, in Kaleidoscope (Twelfth Planet Press) "The Darkness in Clara", Alan Baxter, in SQ Mag 14 (IFWG Publishing Australia)
 "St Dymphna's School for Poison Girls", Angela Slatter, in Review of Australian Fiction, Volume 9, Issue 3 (Review of Australian Fiction)
 "The Female Factory", Lisa L. Hannett and Angela Slatter, in The Female Factory (Twelfth Planet Press)
 "Escapement", Stephanie Gunn, in Kisses by Clockwork (Ticonderoga Publications)

Best Short Story
 "Bahamut", Thoraiya Dyer, in Phantazein (FableCroft Publishing)
 "Vanilla", Dirk Flinthart, in Kaleidoscope (Twelfth Planet Press)
 "Cookie Cutter Superhero", Tansy Rayner Roberts, in Kaleidoscope(Twelfth Planet Press)
 "The Seventh Relic", Cat Sparks, in Phantazein (FableCroft Publishing) "Signature", Faith Mudge, in Kaleidoscope (Twelfth Planet Press)

Best Collected Work
 Kaleidoscope, edited by Alisa Krasnostein and Julia Rios (Twelfth Planet Press) The Year's Best Australian Fantasy and Horror 2013, edited by Liz Grzyb and Talie Helene (Ticonderoga Publications)
 Phantazein, edited by Tehani Wessely (FableCroft Publishing)

Best Artwork
 Illustrations, Kathleen Jennings, in Black-Winged Angels (Ticonderoga Publications)
 Cover art, Kathleen Jennings, of Phantazein (FableCroft Publishing) Illustrations, Kathleen Jennings, in The Bitterwood Bible and Other Recountings (Tartarus Press)

Best Fan Writer
 Tansy Rayner Roberts, for body of work Tsana Dolichva, for body of work
 Bruce Gillespie, for body of work
 Katharine Stubbs, for body of work
 Alexandra Pierce for body of work
 Grant Watson, for body of work
 Sean Wright, for body of work

Best Fan Artist
 Nalini Haynes, for body of work, including "Interstellar Park Ranger Bond, Jaime Bond", "Gabba and Slave Lay-off: Star Wars explains Australian politics", "The Driver", and "Unmasked" in Dark Matter Zine
 Kathleen Jennings, for body of work, including Fakecon art and Illustration Friday series Nick Stathopoulos, for movie poster of It Grows!

Best Fan Publication in Any Medium
 "Snapshot 2014", Tsana Dolichva, Nick Evans, Stephanie Gunn, Kathryn Linge, Elanor Matton-Johnson, David McDonald, Helen Merrick, Jason Nahrung, Ben Payne, Alex Pierce, Tansy Rayner Roberts, Helen Stubbs, Katharine Stubbs, Tehani Wessely, and Sean Wright
 It Grows!, Nick Stathopoulos
 Galactic Suburbia, Alisa Krasnostein, Alexandra Pierce, Tansy Rayner Roberts, and Andrew Finch
 The Writer and the Critic, Kirstyn McDermott and Ian Mond Galactic Chat, Sean Wright, Helen Stubbs, David McDonald, Alexandra Pierce, Sarah Parker, and Mark Webb

Best New Talent
 Helen Stubbs Shauna O'Meara
 Michelle Goldsmith

William Atheling Jr Award for Criticism or Review
 Reviews in The Angriest, Grant Watson
 The Eddings Reread series, Tehani Wessely, Jo Anderton, and Alexandra Pierce, in A Conversational Life
 Reviews in Adventures of a Bookonaut, Sean Wright
 "Does Sex Make Science Fiction Soft?", in Uncanny Magazine 1, Tansy Rayner Roberts Reviews in FictionMachine, Grant Watson
 The Reviewing New Who series, David McDonald, Tansy Rayner Roberts, and Tehani Wessely

2016, Contact2016, Brisbane

Best Novel
 The Dagger's Path, Glenda Larke (Orbit) 
 Day Boy, Trent Jamieson (Text Publishing)
 Graced, Amanda Pillar (Momentum)
 Lament for the Afterlife, Lisa L. Hannett (ChiZine Publications) Zeroes, Scott Westerfeld, Margo Lanagan, and Deborah Biancotti (Simon and Schuster)

Best Novella or Novelette
 "The Cherry Crow Children of Haverny Wood", Deborah Kalin, in Cherry Crow Children (Twelfth Planet Press)
 "Fake Geek Girl", Tansy Rayner Roberts, in Review of Australian Fiction, volume 14, issue 4 (Review of Australian Fiction)
 "Hot Rods", Cat Sparks, in Lightspeed Science Fiction & Fantasy 58 (Lightspeed Science Fiction & Fantasy)
 "The Miseducation of Mara Lys", Deborah Kalin, in Cherry Crow Children (Twelfth Planet Press)
 "Of Sorrow and Such", Angela Slatter, in Of Sorrow and Such (Tor.com) "The Wages of Honey", Deborah Kalin, in Cherry Crow Children (Twelfth Planet Press)

Best Short Story
 "2B", Joanne Anderton, in Insert Title Here (FableCroft Publishing)
 "The Chart of the Vagrant Mariner", Alan Baxter, in Fantasy & Science Fiction, Jan/Feb 2015 (Fantasy & Science Fiction)
 "A Hedge of Yellow Roses", Kathleen Jennings, in Hear Me Roar (Ticonderoga Publications) "Look how cold my hands are", Deborah Biancotti, in Cranky Ladies of History (FableCroft Publishing)

Best Collected Work
 Bloodlines, Amanda Pillar (Ticonderoga Publications)
 Cherry Crow Children, Deborah Kalin, edited by Alisa Krasnostein (Twelfth Planet Press)
 Cranky Ladies of History, Tansy Rayner Roberts and Tehani Wessely (FableCroft Publishing) Letters to Tiptree, Alexandra Pierce and Alisa Krasnostein (Twelfth Planet Press)
 Peripheral Visions: The Collected Ghost Stories by Robert Hood (IFWG Publishing Australia)

Best Artwork
 Cover art, Rovina Cai, for "Tom, Thom" (Tor.com)
 Cover art, Kathleen Jennings, for Bloodlines (Ticonderoga Publications)
 Cover and internal artwork, Kathleen Jennings, for Cranky Ladies of History (FableCroft Publishing) Cover, Shauna O'Meara, for The Never Never Land (CSFG Publishing)
 Illustrations, Shaun Tan, for The Singing Bones (Allen & Unwin)

Best Fan Publication in any Medium
 The Angriest, Grant Watson
 The Coode Street Podcast, Jonathan Strahan and Gary K. Wolfe
 Galactic Suburbia, Alisa Krasnostein, Alexandra Pierce, and Tansy Rayner Roberts SF Commentary, Bruce Gillespie
 The Writer and the Critic, Kirstyn McDermott and Ian Mond

Best Fan Writer
 Tsana Dolichva, for body of work, including reviews and interviews in Tsana's Reads and Reviews
 Foz Meadows, for body of work, including reviews in Shattersnipe: Malcontent & Rainbows
 Ian Mond, for body of work, including The Hysterical Hamster
 Alexandra Pierce, for body of work, including reviews in Randomly Yours, Alex
 Katharine Stubbs, for body of work, including Venture Adlaxre
 Grant Watson, for body of work, including reviews in The Angriest

Best Fan Artist
 Kathleen Jennings, for body of work, including Illustration Friday
 Belinda Morris, for body of work, including Belinda Illustrates

Best New Talent
 Rivqa Rafael
 T. R. Napper
 D. K. Mok
 Liz Barr

William Atheling Jr. Award for Criticism or Review
 Letters to Tiptree, Alexandra Pierce and Alisa Krasnostein (Twelfth Planet Press)
 The Rereading the Empire Trilogy review series, Tansy Rayner Roberts
 The Reviewing New Who series, David McDonald, Tansy Rayner Roberts and Tehani Wessely
 "Sara Kingdom dies at the end", Tansy Rayner Roberts in Companion Piece (Mad Norwegian Press)
 "SF Women of the 20th Century", Tansy Rayner Roberts
 Squeeing over Supergirl, David McDonald and Tehani Wessely series

2017: Continuum 13, Melbourne

Best Novel

 ''The Grief Hole, Kaaron Warren, IFWG Publishing Australia. The Lyre Thief, Jennifer Fallon, HarperCollins.
 Squid's Grief, D.K. Mok, D.K. Mok.
 Vigil, Angela Slatter, Jo Fletcher Books.
 The Wizardry of Jewish Women, Gillian Polack, Satalyte Publishing.

Best Novella or Novelette

 "All the Colours of the Tomato", Simon Petrie, in Dimension6 9.
 "By the Laws of Crab and Woman", Jason Fischer, in Review of Australian Fiction, Vol 17, Issue 6.
 "Did We Break the End of the World?", Tansy Rayner Roberts, in Defying Doomsday, Twelfth Planet Press. "Finnegan's Field", Angela Slatter, in Tor.com.
 "Glass Slipper Scandal", Tansy Rayner Roberts, in Sheep Might Fly.
 "Going Viral", Thoraiya Dyer, in Dimension6 8.

Best Short Story

 "Flame Trees", T.R. Napper, in Asimov's Science Fiction, April/May 2016.
 "No Fat Chicks", Cat Sparks, in In Your Face, FableCroft Publishing. "There's No Place Like Home", Edwina Harvey, in AntipodeanSF 221.

Best Collected Work

 Crow Shine by Alan Baxter, Ticonderoga Publications.
 Defying Doomsday, Tsana Dolichva and Holly Kench, Twelfth Planet Press. Dreaming in the Dark, Jack Dann, PS Publishing. In Your Face, Tehani Wessely, FableCroft Publishing.

Best Artwork

 cover and internal artwork, Adam Browne, for The Tame Animals of Saturn, Peggy Bright Books.
 illustration, Shauna O'Meara, for Lackington's 12.Best Fan Writer

 James 'Jocko' Allen, for body of work.
 Aidan Doyle, for body of work.
 Bruce Gillespie, for body of work.
 Foz Meadows, for body of work. Tansy Rayner Roberts, for body of work.

Best Fan Artist

 Kathleen Jennings, for body of work, including Illustration Friday series.
 No award presentedBest Fan Publication in Any Medium

 2016 Australian SF Snapshot, Greg Chapman, Tehani Croft, Tsana Dolichva, Marisol Dunham, Elizabeth Fitzgerald, Stephanie Gunn, Ju Landéesse, David McDonald, Belle McQuattie, Matthew Morrison, Alex Pierce, Rivqa Rafael, Tansy Rayner Roberts, Helen Stubbs, Katharine Stubbs and Matthew Summers. The Coode Street Podcast, Jonathan Strahan and Gary K. Wolfe
 Earl Grey Editing Services (blog), Elizabeth Fitzgerald.
 Galactic Chat, Alexandra Pierce, David McDonald,  Sarah Parker, Helen Stubbs, Mark Webb, and Sean Wright.
 Galactic Suburbia, Alisa Krasnostein, Alex Pierce, and Tansy Rayner Roberts.
 The Writer and the Critic, Kirstyn McDermott and Ian Mond.

Best New Talent

 T R Napper
 Marlee Jane WardWilliam Atheling Jr Award for Criticism or Review

 Kat Clay for essays and reviews in Weird Fiction Review
 Tehani Croft & Marisol Dunham, for Revisiting Pern: the great McCaffrey reread review series.
 Tsana Dolichva, for reviews, in Tsana's Reads and Reviews.
 Kate Forsyth, for The Rebirth of Rapunzel: a mythic biography of the maiden in the tower, FableCroft Publishing. Ian Mond, for reviews, in The Hysterical Hamster.
 Alexandra Pierce, for reviews, in Randomly Yours, Alex.
 Gillian Polack, for History and Fiction: Writers, their Research, Worlds and Stories, Peter Lang.

2018: Swancon 2018, Perth

Best Novel
 Corpselight, Angela Slatter, Hachette Australia. 
 Crossroads of Canopy, Thoraiya Dyer, Tor. How to Bee , Bren MacDibble, Allen & Unwin.
 In the Dark Spaces, Cally Black, Hardie Grant Egmont.
 Lotus Blue, Cat Sparks, Skyhorse Publishing.

Best Novella or Novelette
 "Island Green", Shauna O'Meara, in Ecopunk!, Ticonderoga Publications.
 "Girl Reporter", Tansy Rayner Roberts, in Girl Reporter, Book Smugglers Publishing. "Matters Arising from the Identification of the Body", Simon Petrie, in Matters Arising from the Identification of the Body, Peggy Bright Books.
 "Monkey Business", Janeen Webb, in Ecopunk!, Ticonderoga Publications.
 "My Sister's Ghost", Kate Forsyth and Kim Wilkins, in The Silver Well, Ticonderoga Publications.

Best Short Story
 "A Harem of Six Legs", Edwina Harvey, in An Eclectic Collection of Stuff and Things, Peggy Bright Books.
 "Mr Mycelium", Claire McKenna, in Ecopunk!, Ticonderoga Publications.
 "A Pearl Beyond Price", Janeen Webb in Cthulhu Deep Down-Under Vol 1, IFWG Publishing Australia. "Prayers to Broken Stone", Cat Sparks, in Kaleidotrope, Spring 2017.
 "Trivalent" by Rivqa Rafael, in Ecopunk!, Ticonderoga Publications.

Best Collected Work
 An Eclectic Collection of Stuff and Things by Edwina Harvey, Peggy Bright Books.
 Ecopunk!, Cat Sparks and Liz Grzyb, Ticonderoga Publications. The Silver Well, Kate Forsyth and Kim Wilkins, Ticonderoga Publications.
 Singing My Sister Down and other stories by Margo Lanagan, Allen & Unwin.

Best Artwork
 Cover art, Lewis Morley, for Matters Arising from the Identification of the Body, Peggy Bright Books. The Grief Hole Illustrated: An Artist's Sketchbook Companion to Kaaron Warren's Supernatural Thriller, Keely Van Order, IFWG Publishing Australia.

Best Fan Publication in any Medium
 Earl Grey Editing (blog), Elizabeth Fitzgerald.
 Galactic Suburbia, Alisa Krasnostein, Alexandra Pierce, Tansy Rayner Roberts.
 No Award (blog), Liz Barr and Stephanie Lai.
 SF Commentary, edited by Bruce Gillespie. The Writer and the Critic, Kirstyn McDermott and Ian Mond.

Best Fan Writer
 Elizabeth Fitzgerald, for writing at Earl Grey Editing.
 Leigh Edmonds, for writing in iOTA.
 Liz Barr, for writing at No Award.
 Stephanie Lai, for writing at No Award.Best Fan Artist
 Shauna O'Meara, for "How to Bee" (based on the novel by Bren MacDibble).

Best New Talent
 Claire G. Coleman
 Stephanie LaiWilliam Atheling Jr. Award for Criticism or Review
 Liz Barr, for Star Trek: Discovery reviews, in No Award.
 Russell Blackford, for Science Fiction and the Moral Imagination: Visions, Minds, Ethics, Springer.
 Ambelin Kwaymullina, for "Reflecting on Indigenous Worlds, Indigenous Futurisms and Artificial Intelligence", Twelfth Planet Press. Alexandra Pierce and Mimi Mondal, for Luminescent Threads: Connections to Octavia E. Butler, Twelfth Planet Press.
 Cat Sparks, for "Science fiction and climate fiction: contemporary literatures of purpose", in Ecopunk! Speculative tales of radical futures, Ticonderoga Publications.

2019: Continuum 15, Melbourne

Best Novel
 Devouring Dark, Alan Baxter, Grey Matter Press.
 The Subjugate, Amanda Bridgeman, Angry Robot.
 Faerie Apocalypse, Jason Franks, IFWG Publishing Australia.
 City of Lies (Poison Wars 1), Sam Hawke, Tom Doherty Associates. The Beast's Heart, Leife Shallcross, Hodder & Stoughton.
 Tide of Stone, Kaaron Warren, Omnium Gatherum.

Best Novella or Novelette
 "Triquetra", Kirstyn McDermott, in Triquetra, Tor.com.
 "Cabaret of Monsters", Tansy Rayner Roberts, in Cabaret of Monsters, The Creature Court.
 "The Dragon's Child", Janeen Webb, in The Dragon's Child, PS Publishing.

Best Short Story
 "The Art of Broken Things", Joanne Anderton, in Mother of Invention, Twelfth Planet Press.
 "A Man Totally Alone", Robert Hood, The Mammoth Book of Halloween Stories: Terrifying Tales Set on the Scariest Night of the Year!, Skyhorse Publishing.
 "The Heart of Owl Abbas", Kathleen Jennings, in Tor.com. "Junkyard Kraken", D.K. Mok, in Mother of Invention, Twelfth Planet Press.

Best Collected Work
 Sword and Sonnet, edited by Aidan Doyle, Rachael K. Jones and E. Catherine Tobler, Ate Bit Bear.
 Mountains of the Mind, Gillian Pollack, Shooting Star Press.
 Mother of Invention, Rivqa Rafael and Tansy Rayner Roberts, Twelfth Planet Press. A Hand of Knaves, Leife Shallcross and Chris Large, CSFG Publishing.
 Tales from the Inner City, Shaun Tan, Allen & Unwin.

Best Artwork
 Cover art, Likhain, for Mother of Invention, Twelfth Planet Press. Cover and internal illustrations, Shauna O'Meara, for A Hand of Knaves, CSFG Publishing.

Best Fan Publication in Any Medium
 Earl Grey Editing, Elizabeth Fitzgerald. Pratchat, Elizabeth Flux, Ben McKenzie, Splendid Chaps Productions.
 SF Commentary, Bruce Gillespie.
 Galactic Suburbia, Alisa Krasnostein, Alexandra Pierce, and Tansy Rayner Roberts.

Best Fan Writer
 Liz Barr, for writing in squiddishly. Bruce Gillespie, for writing in SF Commentary and ANZAPA articles.

Best New Talent
 Elizabeth Fitzgerald
 Sam Hawke Bren MacDibble (aka Cally Black)
 Leife Shallcross

William Atheling Jr Award for Criticism or Review
 Damien Broderick, for Pscience Fiction, McFarland.
 Damien Broderick, for Consciousness and Science Fiction, Springer.
 Tansy Rayner Roberts, for Gentlewomen of the Press, Sheep Might Fly.
 Cat Sparks, for "The 21st Century Catastrophe: Hyper-capitalism and Severe Climate Change in Science Fiction" PhD exegesis.2020: Swancon 2020, Perth
(The convention was cancelled.) There were insufficient nominations for the Best Artwork and Best Fan Artist categories.

There was a preliminary ballot on which Bruce Gillespie was nominated for Best Fan Writer "for writing in SF Commentary and ANZAPA articles".

Best Novel
 Claiming T-Mo, Eugen Bacon, Meerkat Press. The Year of the Fruit Cake, Gillian Polack, IFWG Publishing Australia.Best Short Fiction
 "into bones like oil", Kaaron Warren, in Into Bones like Oil, Meerkat Press. "Whom My Soul Loves", Rivqa Rafael, in Strange Horizons, 11 November 2019.Best Collected Work Collision, J.S. Breukelaar, Meerkat Press.Best Fan Publication in Any Medium Be The Serpent podcast, Alexandra Rowland, Jennifer Mace and Freya Marske. SF Commentary, Bruce Gillespie.Best Fan Writer
 Bruce Gillespie, for writing in SF Commentary. Elizabeth Fitzgerald, for reviews in Skiffy and Fanty.Best New Talent Freya Marske.William Atheling Jr. Award for Criticism or Review
 Eugen Bacon, for Writing Speculative Fiction, Red Globe Press. Grant Watson, for reviews on FictionMachine''.

2021: Conflux, Canberra
(The convention was cancelled.)

Best Novel

 The Left-Handed Booksellers of London, Garth Nix (Allen & Unwin)
 The Crying Forest, Venero Armanno (IFWG Publishing Australia)
 Hollow Empire, Sam Hawke (Penguin)
 The Animals in That Country, Laura Jean McKay (Scribe)
 Monstrous Heart, Claire McKenna (HarperCollins)
 Poison & Light, Gillian Polack (Shooting Star)
 Repo Virtual, Corey J. White (Tor)

Best Novella or Novelette

 Flyaway, Kathleen Jennings (Pan Macmillan Australia)
 “The Attic Tragedy”, J. Ashley-Smith (The Attic Tragedy)
 The Roo, Alan Baxter (self-published)
 “Bad Weather”, Robert Hood (Outback Horrors Down Under)
 “The Weight of the Air, The Weight of the World”, T.R. Napper, (Neon Leviathan)

Best Short Story

 “The Calenture”, Kaaron Warren (Of Gods and Globes 2)
 “The Genetic Alchemist’s Daughter, Elaine Cuyegkeng (Black Cranes: Tales of Unquiet Women)
 “Hacking Santorini”, Cat Sparks (Dark Harvest)

Best Collected Work

 Dark Harvest, Cat Sparks (NewCon)
 Rebuilding Tomorrow, Tsana Dolichva (Twelfth Planet)
 The Zookeeper’s Tales of Interstellar Oddities, Aiki Flinthart & Pamela Jeffs (CAT)
 Songs for Dark Seasons, Lisa L. Hannett (Ticonderoga)
 Neon Leviathan, T.R. Napper (Grimdark)

Best Artwork

 Kathleen Jennings for illustrations in Mother Thorn and other tales of courage and kindness (Serenity)
 Keely Van Order for the cover of Drive, She Said by Tracie McBride (IFWG Publishing Australia)
 Rovina Cai for illustrations in The Giant and the Sea (Lothian)

Best Fan Publication in Any Medium

 The Coode Street Podcast, Jonathan Strahan & Gary K. Wolfe
 Pratchat, Elizabeth Flux & Ben McKenzie (Splendid Chaps)
 Ethel the Aardvark, LynC (Melbourne Science Fiction Club)
 The AntipodeanSF Radio Show, Ion Newcombe

Best Fan Writer

 Bruce Gillespie for writing in SF Commentary
 LynC for writing in Ethel the Aardvark

Best Fan Artist

 Lyss Wickramasinghe for fanart on Tumblr including Elsie, Hold On, The Gem and the Other, and Vesuvia Pride

Best New Talent

 Nikky Lee

William Atheling, Jr. Award for Criticism or Review

 Terry Frost for reviews in Terry Talks Movies
 Kathleen Jennings for “Contracts and Calcifer, or ‘In Which A Contract Is Concluded Before Witnesses’: the transactional structure of Howl’s Moving Castle”, The Proceedings of the Diana Wynne Jones Conference, Bristol 2019 [paper published 2020]
 Grant Watson for reviews in FictionMachine

Some categories had more than five nominees due to ties, and some had fewer due to insufficient nominations.

References

Australian science fiction awards